

Deaths in February

 8: Cesare Rubini
 27: Duke Snider

Current sporting seasons

Auto racing 2011
Sprint Cup
Nationwide Series
Camping World Truck Series
World Rally Championship
V8 Supercar
GP2 Asia Series
Rolex Sports Car Series

Basketball 2011
NBA
NCAA Division I men
NCAA Division I women
Euroleague
EuroLeague Women
Eurocup
EuroChallenge
France
Germany
Greece
Israel
Italy
Philippines
Commissioner's Cup
Russia
Spain
Turkey

Darts 2011
Premier League

Football (soccer) 2011
National teams competitions
UEFA Euro 2012 qualifying
2012 Africa Cup of Nations qualification
International clubs competitions
UEFA (Europe) Champions League
UEFA Europa League
UEFA Women's Champions League
Copa Libertadores (South America)
AFC (Asia) Champions League
CAF (Africa) Champions League
CAF Confederation Cup
CONCACAF (North & Central America) Champions League
OFC (Oceania) Champions League
Domestic (national) competitions
Argentina
Australia
England
France
Germany
Iran
Italy
Scotland
Spain

Golf 2011
PGA Tour
European Tour
LPGA Tour
Champions Tour

Ice hockey 2011
National Hockey League
Kontinental Hockey League
Czech Extraliga
Elitserien
Canadian Hockey League:
OHL, QMJHL, WHL
NCAA Division I men
NCAA Division I women

Motorcycle racing 2011
Superbike World Championship
Supersport World Championship

Rugby league 2011
Super League

Rugby union 2011
Heineken Cup
European Challenge Cup
English Premiership
Celtic League
LV Cup
Top 14
Super Rugby 
Sevens World Series

Snooker 2011
Players Tour Championship

Tennis 2011
ATP World Tour
WTA Tour

Volleyball 2011
International clubs competitions
Men's CEV Champions League
Women's CEV Champions League
Domestic (national) competitions
Iranian Men's Super League
Philippine collegiate (UAAP)

Winter sports
Alpine Skiing World Cup
Biathlon World Cup
Cross-Country Skiing World Cup
Freestyle Skiing World Cup
Nordic Combined World Cup
Ski Jumping World Cup
Snowboard World Cup
Speed Skating World Cup

Days of the month

February 28, 2011 (Monday)

Cricket
World Cup:
Group A:  298/9 (50 overs);  123 (42.1 overs) in Nagpur, India. Zimbabwe win by 175 runs.
Standings (after 2 matches): ,  4 points, Zimbabwe 2, Canada,  0.
Group B:  330/8 (50 overs);  115 (31.3 overs; Kemar Roach 6/27) in New Delhi, India. West Indies win by 215 runs.
Roach bowls the sixth World Cup hat-trick, 28th in One Day Internationals, and the second by a West Indian bowler, dismissing Pieter Seelaar, Bernard Loots and Berend Westdijk to end the Dutch innings.
Standings: ,  3 points (2 matches), West Indies 2 (2),  2 (1),  2 (2),  0 (1), Netherlands 0 (2).

Cross-country skiing
Nordic World Ski Championships in Oslo, Norway:
Women's 10 km classical:  Marit Bjørgen  27:39.3  Justyna Kowalczyk  27:43.4  Aino-Kaisa Saarinen  27:49.0
Bjørgen wins her third title of the championships and seventh of her career.

Nordic combined
Nordic World Ski Championships in Oslo, Norway:
Team normal hill/4 x 5 km:   (David Kreiner, Bernhard Gruber, Felix Gottwald, Mario Stecher) 48:07.8   (Johannes Rydzek, Björn Kircheisen, Tino Edelmann, Eric Frenzel) 48:08.2   (Jan Schmid, Magnus Moan, Mikko Kokslien, Håvard Klemetsen) 48:48.4

February 27, 2011 (Sunday)

Alpine skiing
Women's World Cup in Åre, Sweden:
Super-G:  Maria Riesch  1:13.24  Lindsey Vonn  1:13.25  Julia Mancuso  1:14.02
Super-G standings (after 5 of 7 races): (1) Vonn 460 points (2) Riesch 329 (3) Lara Gut  250
Overall standings (after 26 of 38 races): (1) Riesch 1516 points (2) Vonn 1320 (3) Elisabeth Görgl  748
Men's World Cup in Bansko, Bulgaria:
Slalom:  Mario Matt  1:50.35 (54.21 / 56.14)  Reinfried Herbst  1:50.39 (54.33 / 56.06)  Jean-Baptiste Grange  1:50.83 (55.89 / 55.94)
Slalom standings (after 8 of 10 races): (1) Ivica Kostelić  472 points (2) Grange 442 (3) André Myhrer  333
Overall standings (after 29 of 38 races): (1) Kostelić 1294 points (2) Didier Cuche  725 (3) Aksel Lund Svindal  713

Auto racing
Sprint Cup Series:
Subway Fresh Fit 500 in Avondale, Arizona: (1)  Jeff Gordon (Chevrolet; Hendrick Motorsports) (2)  Kyle Busch (Toyota; Joe Gibbs Racing) (3)  Jimmie Johnson (Chevrolet; Hendrick Motorsports)
Gordon ends a 66-race winless streak to win his 83rd Cup race, and ties Cale Yarborough for fifth place on the all-time wins list.
Drivers' championship standings (after 2 of 36 races): (1) Kyle Busch 80 points (2)  Kurt Busch (Dodge; Penske Racing) 77 (3)  Tony Stewart (Chevrolet; Stewart Haas Racing) &  A. J. Allmendinger (Ford; Richard Petty Motorsports) 69

Bobsleigh
FIBT World Championships in Königssee, Germany:
Four-man:   I (Manuel Machata, Andreas Bredau, Richard Adjei, Christian Poser) 3:16.58 (48.65 / 48.79 / 49.26 / 49.88) (2)  II (Karl Angerer, Gregor Bermbach, Alex Mann, Christian Friedrich) 3:17.10 (48.74 / 48.92 / 49.31 / 50.13) (3)  I (Steve Holcomb, Justin Olsen, Steven Langton, Curtis Tomasevicz) 3:17.26 (48.81 / 49.01 / 49.46 / 49.98)
Machata, Bredau, Adjei and Poser all win their first world title.

Cricket
World Cup:
Group B:  338 (49.5 overs; Sachin Tendulkar 120, Tim Bresnan 5/48);  338/8 (50 overs; Andrew Strauss 158) in Bangalore, India. Match tied.
Standings: India, England 3 points (2 matches),  2 (1),  2 (2),  0 (1).

Cross-country skiing
Nordic World Ski Championships in Oslo, Norway:
Men's 30 km pursuit:  Petter Northug  1:14:10.4  Maxim Vylegzhanin  1:14:11.1  Ilia Chernousov  1:14:11.6
Northug wins his second successive title in this event and fifth world title overall.

Equestrianism
Show jumping:
FEI World Cup – Western European League:
12th competition in Gothenburg (CSI 5*-W):  Angelica Augustsson  on Midtown du Tillard  Edwina Alexander  on Ciske van Overis  Ludger Beerbaum  on Gotha
Standings (after 12 of 13 competitions): (1) Kevin Staut  87 points (2) Meredith Michaels-Beerbaum  73 (3) Rolf-Göran Bengtsson  73

Football (soccer)
CONCACAF U-17 Championship in Montego Bay, Jamaica:
Third Place Match:   1–0 
Final:   0–3 (a.e.t.)  
The United States win the under-17 tournament for the first time.
OFC Champions League Group stage, matchday 5 (team in bold advance to the final):
Group B: Auckland City FC  1–0  Waitakere United
Standings (after 5 matches): Auckland City FC 11 points,  AS Magenta 7, Waitakere United 5,  AS Tefana 4.
 League Cup Final in London:
Arsenal 1–2 Birmingham City
Birmingham City win the League Cup for the second time and qualify for UEFA Europa League.
 Campeonato Carioca:
Taça Guanabara Final: Flamengo 1–0 Boavista
Flamengo win the title for the 19th time.

Golf
World Golf Championships:
WGC-Accenture Match Play Championship in Marana, Arizona, United States:
Final: Luke Donald  def. Martin Kaymer  3 & 2
Donald wins his first individual WGC event, for his third PGA Tour title and fourth on the European Tour.
Kaymer will replace Lee Westwood  at the top of the official world rankings, ending Westwood's 17-week run.
Consolation match: Matt Kuchar  def. Bubba Watson  2 & 1
PGA Tour:
Mayakoba Golf Classic at Riviera Maya in Cancún, Mexico:
Winner: Johnson Wagner  267 (−17)PO
Wagner defeats Spencer Levin  on the first playoff hole, for his second PGA Tour title.
LPGA Tour:
HSBC Women's Champions in Singapore:
Winner: Karrie Webb  275 (−13)
Webb wins her 37th LPGA Tour title, and first in nearly two years.

Mixed martial arts
UFC 127 in Sydney, Australia:
Welterweight bout: B.J. Penn  and Jon Fitch  fought to a majority draw (29–28 Fitch, 28–28, 28–28)
Middleweight bout: Michael Bisping  def. Jorge Rivera  by TKO (strikes)
Lightweight bout: Dennis Siver  def. George Sotiropoulos  by unanimous decision (29–28, 30–28, 30–27)
Welterweight bout: Brian Ebersole  def. Chris Lytle  by unanimous decision (30–27, 29–28, 29–28)
Middleweight bout: Kyle Noke  def. Chris Camozzi  by submission (rear naked choke)

Motorcycle racing
Superbike:
Phillip Island World Championship round in Phillip Island, Australia:
Race 1: (1) Carlos Checa  (Ducati 1198) (2) Max Biaggi  (Aprilia RSV4) (3) Leon Haslam  (BMW S1000RR)
Race 2: (1) Checa (2) Biaggi (3) Marco Melandri  (Yamaha YZF-R1)
Supersport:
Phillip Island World Championship round in Phillip Island, Australia: (1) Luca Scassa  (Yamaha YZF-R6) (2) Broc Parkes  (Kawasaki Ninja ZX-6R) (3) Sam Lowes  (Honda CBR600RR)

Rugby league
World Club Challenge in Wigan, England:
Wigan Warriors  15–21  St. George Illawarra Dragons
The Dragons win at their first attempt, and become the fifth Australian side to win the Challenge.

Rugby union
Six Nations Championship, week 3:
 18–21  in Edinburgh
Ireland's Ronan O'Gara takes over from England's Jonny Wilkinson as the leading career point scorer in the Championship with 543 points, two ahead of Wilkinson.
Standings (after 3 matches):  6 points, Ireland 4, Scotland,  0.

Short track speed skating
World Junior Championships in Courmayeur, Italy:
Men's 1000 m: (1) Jack Whelbourne  1:26.049 (2) Seo Yi Ra  1:26.086 (3) Shi Jingnan  1:26.312
Men's 1500 m super final: (1) Seo 2:13.990 (2) Whelbourne 2:19.895 (3) Shi 2:20.144
Men's final standings:  Seo 89 points  Whelbourne 76  Wu Dajing  40
Women's 1000 m: (1) Ahn Se Jung  1:31.336 (2) Noh Do Hee  1:31.446 (3) Xiao Han  1:31.527
Women's 1500 m super final: (1) Cheon Hee Jung  2:38.268 (2) Noh 2:38.339 (3) Ahn 2:38.408
Women's final standings:  Cheon 68 points  Ahn 68  Martina Valcepina  50
Men's 3000 m relay:   (Thibault Crolet, Sebastien LePape, Alexis Yang, Vincent Giannitrapani) 4:08.911   (Minto Sekai, Keita Watanabe, Hiroki Yokoyama, Masashi Yoshikawa) 4:09.923   (Patrick Duffy, Pier-Olivier Gagnon, Alexandre St. Jean, Maxime Gauthier) 4:15.867
Women's 3000 m relay:   (Yelenia Tota, Arianna Valcepina, Martina Valcepina, Elena Viviani) 4:20.004   (Laurie Marceau, Cynthia Mascitto, Ann-Veronique Michaud, Courtney Shmyr) 4:20.166   (Xhao, Lin Meng, Jingzhu Jin, Shaoyang Zhang) 4:32.995

Ski jumping
Nordic World Ski Championships in Oslo, Norway:
Men's team normal hill:   (Gregor Schlierenzauer, Martin Koch, Andreas Kofler, Thomas Morgenstern) 1025.5 points   (Anders Jacobsen, Bjørn Einar Romøren, Anders Bardal, Tom Hilde) 1000.5   (Martin Schmitt, Michael Neumayer, Michael Uhrmann, Severin Freund) 968.2
Morgenstern wins his second title of the championships and the sixth of his career.

Tennis
ATP World Tour:
Delray Beach International Tennis Championships in Delray Beach, United States:
Final: Juan Martín del Potro  def. Janko Tipsarević  6–4, 6–4
Del Potro wins his eighth career title, and his first since winning the 2009 US Open.

February 26, 2011 (Saturday)

Alpine skiing
Women's World Cup in Åre, Sweden:
Downhill:  Lindsey Vonn  1:40.93  Tina Maze  1:41.06  Maria Riesch  1:41.14
Downhill standings (after 6 of 9 races): (1) Vonn 520 points (2) Riesch 417 (3) Julia Mancuso  241
Overall standings (after 25 of 38 races): (1) Riesch 1416 points (2) Vonn 1240 (3) Elisabeth Görgl  738
Men's World Cup in Bansko, Bulgaria:
Super combined:  Christof Innerhofer  2:23.87 (1:01.12 / 1:22.75)  Felix Neureuther  2:23.88 (59.92 / 1:23.96)  Thomas Mermillod-Blondin  2:24.20 (1:01.68 / 1:22.52)
Final combined standings: (1) Ivica Kostelić  345 points (2) Innerhofer 219 (3) Kjetil Jansrud  145
Kostelić wins his first combined World Cup title, and his first discipline title in nine years.
Overall standings (after 28 of 38 races): (1) Kostelić 1294 points (2) Didier Cuche  725 (3) Aksel Lund Svindal  713

Auto racing
Nationwide Series:
Bashas' Supermarkets 200 in Phoenix, Arizona: (1)  Kyle Busch (Toyota; Joe Gibbs Racing) (2)  Carl Edwards (Ford; Roush Fenway Racing) (3)  Kevin Harvick (Chevrolet; Kevin Harvick Incorporated)
Drivers' championship standings (after 2 of 34 races): (1)  Reed Sorenson (Chevrolet; Turner Motorsports) 78 points (2)  Ricky Stenhouse Jr. (Ford; Roush Fenway Racing) 73 (3)  Jason Leffler (Chevrolet; Turner Motorsports) 71

Bobsleigh
FIBT World Championships in Königssee, Germany:
Four-man standings after 2 runs: (1)  I (Manuel Machata, Andreas Bredau, Richard Adjei, Christian Poser) 1:37.44 (2)  II (Karl Angerer, Gregor Bermbach, Alex Mann, Christian Friedrich) 1:37.66 (3)  I (Alexandr Zubkov, Filipp Yegorov, Dmitry Trunenkov, Nikolay Hrenkov) 1:37.78

Cricket
World Cup:
Group A:  277/7 (50 overs);  266/9 (50 overs) in Colombo, Sri Lanka. Pakistan win by 11 runs.
Standings: Pakistan,  4 points (2 matches), Sri Lanka,  2 (2),  0 (1),  0 (2).

Cross-country skiing
Nordic World Ski Championships in Oslo, Norway:
Women's 15 km pursuit:  Marit Bjørgen  38:08.6  Justyna Kowalczyk  38:16.1  Therese Johaug  38:17.4
Bjørgen wins her second title of the championships, and the sixth of her career.

Equestrianism
Dressage:
FEI World Cup Western European League:
9th competition in Gothenburg (CDI-W):  Adelinde Cornelissen  on Parzival  Patrik Kittel  on Watermill Scandic  Isabell Werth  on Warum nicht FRH
Standings (after 9 of 10 competitions): (1) Cornelissen 80 points (2) Ulla Salzgeber  77 (3) Werth 74
Show jumping:
FEI World Cup North American League – West Coast:
14th competition in Thermal, California (CSI 2*-W):  Mark Watring  on Vioco  Rich Fellers  on Flexible  Susan Hutchison  on Cantano

Football (soccer)
OFC Champions League Group stage, matchday 5:
Group A:
Koloale  2–1  PRK Hekari United
Amicale  5–1  Lautoka
Standings (after 5 matches): Amicale 10 points, Lautoka 7, Koloale 6, PRK Hekari United 5.

Freestyle skiing
World Cup in Mariánské Lázně, Czech Republic:
Men's Dual Moguls:  Alexandre Bilodeau  18.00 points  Mikaël Kingsbury  17.00  Jeremy Cota  22.00
Moguls standings (after 8 of 11 events): (1) Guilbaut Colas  581 points (2) Kingsbury 535 (3) Bilodeau 479
Overall standings: (1) Colas 73 points (2) Andreas Matt  71 (3) Kingsbury 67
Women's Dual Moguls:  Hannah Kearney  19.00 points  Jennifer Heil  16.00  Chloé Dufour-Lapointe  19.00
Moguls standings (after 8 of 11 events): (1) Kearney 709 points (2) Heil 492 (3) Audrey Robichaud  350
Overall standings: (1) Kearney 89 points (2) Cheng Shuang  63 (3) Heil 62

Nordic combined
Nordic World Ski Championships in Oslo, Norway:
Individual normal hill/10 km:  Eric Frenzel  25:19.2  Tino Edelmann  25:31.1  Felix Gottwald  25:37.6
Frenzel wins his first world title.

Rugby union
Six Nations Championship, week 3:
 16–24  in Rome
 17–9  in London
England's Jonny Wilkinson reclaims his place as the highest point scorer in Test rugby with 1190 points, two ahead of Dan Carter (NZL).
Standings: England 6 points (3 matches), Wales, France 4 (3),  2 (2),  0 (2), Italy 0 (3).
European Nations Cup First Division, week 3:
 12–13  in Lisbon
 33–3  in Bucharest
 35–13  in Madrid
Standings: Georgia 14 points (3 matches), Portugal 9 (3), Spain 6 (3), Romania 5 (2), Russia 5 (3), Ukraine 0 (2).

Short track speed skating
World Junior Championships in Courmayeur, Italy:
Men's 500 m: (1) Liu Songbo  43.065 (2) Wu Dajing  50.424
Women's 500 m: (1) Martina Valcepina  45.136 (2) Lara van Ruijven  45.470 (3) Lin Meng  45.622

Skeleton
FIBT World Championships in Königssee, Germany:
Women:  Marion Thees  3:28.51 (52.22 / 52.21 / 52.07 / 52.01)  Anja Huber  3:29.39 (52.44 / 52.14 / 52.35 / 52.46)  Mellisa Hollingsworth  3:29.74 (52.64 / 52.34 / 52.46 / 52.30)
Thees wins her second consecutive world title.

Ski jumping
Nordic World Ski Championships in Oslo, Norway:
Men's individual normal hill:  Thomas Morgenstern  269.2 points  Andreas Kofler  260.1  Adam Małysz  252.2
Morgenstern wins his first individual world title, and fifth overall.

Snowboarding
World Cup in Calgary, Alberta, Canada:
Men's halfpipe:  Ryō Aono  28.3 points  Nathan Johnstone  27.7  Zhang Yiwei  27.0
Halfpipe standings (after 4 of 6 events): (1) Aono 2800 points (2) Johnstone 2060 (3) Zhang 1470
Men's slopestyle:  Clemens Schattschneider  27.4 points  Robby Balharry  26.3  Zachary Stone  25.6
Big Air/Slopestyle standings (after 5 of 6 events): (1) Schattschneider 2360 points (2) Sebastien Toutant  2220 (3) Rocco van Straten  1845
Freestyle overall standings: (1) Aono 2800 points (2) Schattschneider 2508 (3) Toutant 2220
Women's halfpipe:  Cai Xuetong  24.9 points  Holly Crawford  23.0  Haruna Matsumoto  22.3
Halfpipe standings (after 4 of 6 events): (1) Cai 3800 points (2) Crawford 2100 (3) Sun Zhifeng  1940
Women's slopestyle:  Allyson Carroll  21.0 points  Brooke Voigt  18.3  Pia Meusburger  15.4
Freestyle overall standings: (1) Cai 3800 points (2) Crawford 2100 (3) Sun 1940

Tennis
ATP World Tour:
Dubai Duty Free Tennis Championships in Dubai, United Arab Emirates:
Final: Novak Djokovic  def. Roger Federer  6–3, 6–3
Djokovic wins the tournament for the third consecutive year, and his 20th career title.
Abierto Mexicano Telcel in Acapulco, Mexico:
Final: David Ferrer  def. Nicolás Almagro   7–6(4), 6–7(2), 6–2
Ferrer wins his second title of the year and 11th of his career, and his second consecutive win at the event.
WTA Tour:
Qatar Ladies Open in Doha, Qatar:
Final: Vera Zvonareva  def. Caroline Wozniacki  6–4, 6–4
Zvonareva wins the 11th title of her career.
Abierto Mexicano Telcel in Acapulco, Mexico:
Final: Gisela Dulko  def. Arantxa Parra Santonja  6–3, 7–6(5)
Dulko wins the fourth title of her career.

February 25, 2011 (Friday)

Alpine skiing
Women's World Cup in Åre, Sweden:
Super combined:  Maria Riesch  1:59.60 (1:14.21 / 45.39)  Tina Maze  2:00.00 (1:14.81 / 45.19)  Elisabeth Görgl  2:00.26 (1:14.40 / 45.86)
Combined standings (after 2 of 3 races): (1) Riesch 145 points (2) Görgl & Lindsey Vonn  140
Overall standings (after 24 of 38 races): (1) Riesch 1356 points (2) Vonn 1140 (3) Görgl 738

Cricket
World Cup:
Group A:  206 (45.1 overs);  207/3 (34 overs) in Nagpur, India. Australia win by 7 wickets.
Standings: Australia 4 points (2 matches),  2 (1), New Zealand 2 (2),  0 (1),  0 (2).
Group B:  205 (49.2 overs);  178 (45 overs) in Mirpur Thana, Bangladesh. Bangladesh win by 27 runs.

Football (soccer)
African Nations Championship in Omdurman, Sudan:
Third Place Playoff:  0–1  
Final:   3–0  
Tunisia win the title for the first time.
CONCACAF U-17 Championship in Montego Bay, Jamaica:
Semifinals:
 0–1 
 2–0 
OFC Champions League Group stage, matchday 5:
Group B: AS Tefana  0–3  AS Magenta
Standings:  Auckland City FC 8 points (4 matches), AS Magenta 7 (5),  Waitakere United 5 (4), AS Tefana 4 (5).

Short track speed skating
World Junior Championships in Courmayeur, Italy:
Men's 1500 m: (1) Seo Yi-Ra  2:20.410 (2) Jack Whelbourne  2:20.592 (3) Lee Hyo-Been  2:20.663
Women's 1500 m: (1) Cheon Hee-Jung  2:28.227 (2) Ahn Se-Jung  2:28.316 (3) Lin Meng  2:28.858

Skeleton
FIBT World Championships in Königssee, Germany:
Men:  Martins Dukurs  3:23.70 (51.18 / 50.67 / 50.94 / 50.91)  Aleksandr Tretyakov  3:25.44 (51.43 / 51.14 / 51.62 / 51.25)  Frank Rommel  3:25.68 (51.71 / 51.14 / 51.53 / 51.30)
Dukurs wins Latvia's first world skeleton title.
Women's standings after 2 of 4 runs: (1) Marion Thees  1:44.43 (2) Anja Huber  1:44.58 (3) Mellisa Hollingsworth  1:44.98

Ski jumping
Nordic World Ski Championships in Oslo, Norway:
Women's individual normal hill:  Daniela Iraschko  231.7 points  Elena Runggaldier  218.9  Coline Mattel  211.5

February 24, 2011 (Thursday)

Basketball
Euroleague Top 16, matchday 5 (teams in bold advance to quarterfinals):
Group E: Caja Laboral  78–63  Unicaja Málaga
Standings:  Panathinaikos Athens,  Lietuvos Rytas, Caja Laboral 3–2; Unicaja Málaga 1–4.
Group F: Maccabi Tel Aviv  85–92 (OT)  Regal FC Barcelona
Standings: Regal FC Barcelona 5–0; Maccabi Tel Aviv 3–2;  Virtus Roma,  Union Olimpija Ljubljana 1–4.
Group G:
Partizan Belgrade  56–61  Real Madrid
Montepaschi Siena  88–76  Efes Pilsen Istanbul
Standings: Real Madrid 5–0; Montepaschi Siena 3–2; Efes Pilsen 2–3; Partizan Belgrade 0–5.
Group H:
Žalgiris Kaunas  74–80  Power Electronics Valencia
Fenerbahçe Ülker  65–80  Olympiacos Piraeus
Standings: Olympiacos Piraeus 4–1; Fenerbahçe Ülker 3–2; Power Electronics Valencia 2–3; Žalgiris Kaunas 1–4.

Cricket
World Cup:
Group B:  222 (47.3 overs);  223/3 (42.5 overs; AB de Villiers 107*) in New Delhi. South Africa win by 7 wickets.

Cross-country skiing
Nordic World Ski Championships in Oslo, Norway:
Men's sprint:  Marcus Hellner  2:57.4  Petter Northug  2:58.0  Emil Jönsson  2:58.5
Hellner becomes the first Swede to win the sprint world title since Thobias Fredriksson in 2003.
Women's sprint:  Marit Bjørgen  3:03.9  Arianna Follis  3:04.1  Petra Majdič  3:04.4
Bjørgen wins her second world sprint title, and her fifth world title overall.

Darts
Premier League, week 3 in Belfast, Northern Ireland:
Gary Anderson  8–1 Mark Webster 
Simon Whitlock  8–5 James Wade 
Adrian Lewis  6–8 Raymond van Barneveld 
Phil Taylor  8–2 Terry Jenkins 
High Checkout: Lewis 170
Standings (after 3 matches): Anderson 6 points, van Barneveld, Taylor 4, Lewis, Whitlock, Webster, Wade, Jenkins 2.

Football (soccer)
UEFA Europa League Round of 32, second leg (first leg score in parentheses):
Zenit St. Petersburg  3–1 (1–2)  Young Boys. Zenit St. Petersburg win 4–3 on aggregate.
Sporting CP  2–2 (1–1)  Rangers. 3–3 on aggregate; Rangers win on away goals.
Liverpool  1–0 (0–0)  Sparta Prague. Liverpool win 1–0 on aggregate.
Spartak Moscow  1–1 (3–2)  Basel. Spartak Moscow win 4–3 on aggregate.
PSV Eindhoven  3–1 (2–2)  Lille. PSV Eindhoven win 5–3 on aggregate.
Bayer Leverkusen  2–0 (4–0)  Metalist Kharkiv. Bayer Leverkusen win 6–0 on aggregate.
Villarreal  2–1 (0–0)  Napoli. Villarreal win 2–1 on aggregate.
Ajax  2–0 (3–0)  Anderlecht. Ajax win 5–0 on aggregate.
Braga  2–0 (0–1)  Lech Poznań. Braga win 2–1 on aggregate.
Dynamo Kyiv  4–0 (4–1)  Beşiktaş. Dynamo Kyiv win 8–1 on aggregate.
Manchester City  3–0 (0–0)  Aris. Manchester City win 3–0 on aggregate.
Twente  2–2 (2–0)  Rubin Kazan. Twente win 4–2 on aggregate.
Stuttgart  0–2 (1–2)  Benfica. Benfica win 4–1 on aggregate.
Paris Saint-Germain  0–0 (2–2)  BATE. 2–2 on aggregate; Paris Saint-Germain win on away goals.
Copa Libertadores Second Stage:
Group 2: Junior  2–1  Grêmio
Standings (after 2 matches): Junior 6 points, Grêmio,  León de Huánuco 3,  Oriente Petrolero 0.
Group 3: Argentinos Juniors  3–1  América
Standings (after 2 matches): Argentinos Juniors 4 points, América 3,  Fluminense 2,  Nacional 1.
Group 8: Independiente  3–0  Peñarol
CONCACAF Champions League Quarterfinals, first leg: Saprissa  1–0  Olimpia

Skeleton
FIBT World Championships in Königssee, Germany:
Men's standings after 2 of 4 runs: (1) Martins Dukurs  1:41.85 (2) Michi Halilović  1:42.42 (3) Sandro Stielicke  1:42.55

February 23, 2011 (Wednesday)

Basketball
Euroleague Top 16, matchday 5 (teams in bold advance to quarterfinals):
Group E: Panathinaikos Athens  67–68  Lietuvos Rytas
Standings: Panathinaikos Athens, Lietuvos Rytas 3–2;  Caja Laboral 2–2;  Unicaja Málaga 1–3.
Group F: Union Olimpija Ljubljana  76–87  Virtus Roma
Standings:  Regal FC Barcelona 4–0;  Maccabi Tel Aviv 3–1; Virtus Roma, Union Olimpija Ljubljana 1–4.

Cricket
World Cup:
Group A:  317/7 (50 overs);  112 (33.1 overs; Shahid Afridi 5/16) in Hambantota, Sri Lanka. Pakistan win by 205 runs.

Football (soccer)
CONCACAF U-17 Championship in Montego Bay, Jamaica:
Quarterfinals:
 2–0 
 2–1 
UEFA Champions League Round of 16, first leg:
Marseille  0–0  Manchester United
Internazionale  0–1  Bayern Munich
UEFA Europa League Round of 32, second leg: (first leg score in parentheses)
Porto  0–1 (2–1)  Sevilla. 2–2 on aggregate; Porto win on away goals.
Copa Libertadores Second Stage:
Group 2: León de Huánuco  1–0  Oriente Petrolero
Standings:  Grêmio,  Junior 3 points (1 match), León de Huánuco 3 (2), Oriente Petrolero 0 (2).
Group 3: Fluminense  0–0  Nacional
Standings:  América 3 points (1 match), Fluminense 2 (2),  Argentinos Juniors 1 (1), Nacional 1 (2).
Group 6: Internacional  4–0  Jaguares
Standings (after 2 matches): Internacional,  Emelec 4 points, Jaguares 3,  Jorge Wilstermann 0.
Group 7: Estudiantes  1–0  Deportes Tolima
Standings (after 2 matches):  Cruzeiro 6 points, Deportes Tolima, Estudiantes 3,  Guaraní 0.
CONCACAF Champions League Quarterfinals, first leg: Toluca  0–1  Monterrey

February 22, 2011 (Tuesday)

Cricket
World Cup:
Group B:  292/6 (50 overs; Ryan ten Doeschate 119);  296/4 (48.4 overs) in Nagpur, India. England win by 6 wickets.

Football (soccer)
CONCACAF U-17 Championship in Montego Bay, Jamaica:
Quarterfinals:
 0–1 
 3–2 (a.e.t.) 
African Nations Championship in Sudan:
Semi-finals:
 1–1 (3–5 pen.) 
 1–1 (2–4 pen.) 
UEFA Champions League Round of 16, first leg:
Copenhagen  0–2  Chelsea
Lyon  1–1  Real Madrid
UEFA Europa League Round of 32, second leg: (first leg score in parentheses)
CSKA Moscow  1–1 (1–0)  PAOK. CSKA Moscow win 2–1 on aggregate.
Copa Libertadores Second Stage:
Group 1:
Universidad San Martín  2–0  San Luis
Once Caldas  1–1  Libertad
Standings (after 2 matches): Universidad San Martín 6 points, Libertad 4, Once Caldas 1, San Luis 0.
Group 6: Emelec  1–0  Jorge Wilstermann
Standings: Emelec 4 points (2 matches),  Jaguares 3 (1),  Internacional 1 (1), Jorge Wilstermann 0 (2).
Group 7: Cruzeiro  4–0  Guaraní
Standings: Cruzeiro 6 points (2 matches),  Deportes Tolima 3 (1),  Estudiantes 0 (1), Guaraní 0 (2).
CONCACAF Champions League Quarterfinals, first leg:
Columbus Crew  0–0  Real Salt Lake
Cruz Azul  2–0  Santos Laguna

February 21, 2011 (Monday)

Cricket
World Cup:
Group A:  262/6 (50 overs);  171 (46.2 overs) in Ahmedabad, India. Australia win by 91 runs.

Football (soccer)
OFC Champions League Group stage, matchday 4:
Group B: AS Magenta  0–1  Auckland City
Standings (after 4 matches): Auckland City 8 points,  Waitakere United 5,  AS Tefana, AS Magenta 4.

February 20, 2011 (Sunday)

Alpine skiing
World Championships in Garmisch-Partenkirchen, Germany:
Men's Slalom:  Jean-Baptiste Grange  1:41.72 (51.30 / 50.42)  Jens Byggmark  1:42.15 (52.39 / 49.76)  Manfred Mölgg  1:42.33 (51.52 / 50.81)
Grange becomes France's first male world champion since Michel Vion won the combined title in 1982.

Auto racing
Sprint Cup Series:
Daytona 500 in Daytona Beach, Florida: (1)  Trevor Bayne (Ford; Wood Brothers Racing) (2)  Carl Edwards (Ford; Roush Fenway Racing) (3)  David Gilliland (Ford; Front Row Motorsports)
Bayne wins in only his second Sprint Cup start, and ties Jamie McMurray's modern-era record from 2002.

Badminton
European Mixed Team Championships in Amsterdam, Netherlands:
Final:   3–1  
Denmark win their ninth successive title, and 14th overall.

Basketball
NBA All-Star Game in Los Angeles:
West 148, East 143
Kobe Bryant, who scores a game-high 37 points, is named MVP for the fourth time and ties the record of Bob Pettit.

Bobsleigh
FIBT World Championships in Königssee, Germany:
Two-man:  Alexandr Zubkov/Alexey Voyevoda  3:20.72 (50.31 / 50.25 / 50.20 / 49.96)  Thomas Florschütz/Kevin Kuske  3:20.90 (50.50 / 50.17 / 50.29 / 49.94)  Manuel Machata/Andreas Bredau  3:20.90 (50.51 / 50.26 / 50.24 / 49.89)
Zubkov and Voyevoda become the first Russians to win a world title.
Mixed team:   II (Michi Halilović, Sandra Kiriasis/Stephanie Schneider, Marion Thees, Francesco Friedrich/Florian Becke) 3:26.09 (51.40 / 51.60 / 52.82 / 50.27)   I (Frank Rommel, Cathleen Martini/Kristin Steinert, Anja Huber, Karl Angerer/Alex Mann) 3:26.15 (51.52 / 51.50 / 52.74 / 50.39)   I (Jon Montgomery, Kaillie Humphries/Heather Moyse, Mellisa Hollingsworth, Lyndon Rush/Neville Wright) 3:26.96 (51.54 / 51.40 / 53.67 / 50.35)
Germany win the event for the fourth successive time.

Cricket
World Cup:
Group A:
 69 (23.5 overs);  72/0 (8 overs) in Chennai, India. New Zealand win by 10 wickets.
 332/7 (50 overs; Mahela Jayawardene 100);  122 (36.5 overs) in Hambantota, Sri Lanka. Sri Lanka win by 210 runs.

Cross-country skiing
World Cup in Drammen, Norway:
Men's Sprint Freestyle:  Emil Jönsson  3:04.8  Alex Harvey  3:05.4  Petter Northug  3:05.7
Sprint standings (after 9 of 11 races): (1) Jönsson 430 points (2) Ola Vigen Hattestad  344 (3) Alexei Petukhov  277
Overall standings (after 25 of 31 races): (1) Dario Cologna  1247 points (2) Northug 894 (3) Daniel Richardsson  781
Women's Sprint Freestyle:  Kikkan Randall  2:17.2  Maiken Caspersen Falla  2:17.5  Charlotte Kalla  2:17.8
Sprint standings (after 9 of 11 races): (1) Randall 391 points (2) Arianna Follis  383 (3) Petra Majdič  370
Overall standings (after 25 of 31 races): (1) Justyna Kowalczyk  1659 points (2) Marit Bjørgen  1067 (3) Follis 1025

Equestrianism
Dressage:
FEI World Cup Western European League:
8th competition in Neumünster (CDI-W):  Ulla Salzgeber  on Herzruf's Erbe  Isabell Werth  on Satchmo  Helen Langehanenberg  on Damon Hill NRW
Standings (after 8 of 10 competitions): (1) Salzgeber 77 points (2) Werth 74 (3) Adelinde Cornelissen  63

Figure skating
Four Continents Championships in Taipei, Chinese Taipei:
Ladies:  Miki Ando  201.34 points  Mao Asada  196.30  Mirai Nagasu  189.46
Ando wins the title for the first time.

Golf
PGA Tour:
Northern Trust Open in Pacific Palisades, California:
Winner: Aaron Baddeley  272 (−12)
Baddeley wins his third PGA Tour title, and first for four years.
European Tour:
Avantha Masters in New Delhi, India:
Winner: Shiv Chowrasia  273 (−15)
Chowrasia wins his second European Tour title.
LPGA Tour:
Honda LPGA Thailand in Chonburi:
Winner: Yani Tseng  273 (−15)
Tseng wins her sixth LPGA Tour title.
Champions Tour:
The ACE Group Classic in Naples, Florida:
Winner: Bernhard Langer  196 (−20)
Langer wins his 14th Champions Tour title.

Ice hockey
NHL Heritage Classic in Calgary, Alberta:
Calgary Flames 4, Montreal Canadiens 0
The Flames' Miikka Kiprusoff becomes the first goaltender to record a shutout in an outdoor NHL game, making 39 saves.

Luge
World Cup in Sigulda, Latvia:
Women's:  Tatjana Hüfner  1:24.679 (42.405 / 42.274)  Tatiana Ivanova  1:24.692 (42.354 / 42.338)  Anke Wischnewski  1:25.187 (42.659 / 42.528)
Hüfner wins her seventh race of the season, and ties her own record from 2007–08.
Final standings: (1) Hüfner 845 points (2) Natalie Geisenberger  680 (3) Wischnewski 605
Hüfner wins her fourth consecutive World Cup title.
Team relay:   (Tatiana Ivanova, Albert Demtschenko, Vladislav Yuzhakov/Vladimir Makhnutin) 2:15.660 (43.915 / 45.668 / 46.077)   (Sandra Gasparini, Armin Zöggeler, Christian Oberstolz/Patrick Gruber) 2:16.417 (44.736 / 45.633 / 46.048)   (Tatjana Hüfner, Jan-Armin Eichhorn, Toni Eggert/Sascha Benecken) 2:16.626 (43.764 / 45.969 / 46.893)
Final standings: (1) Germany 570 points (2) Italy 440 (3) Russia 426
Germany win their fifth consecutive title.

Short track speed skating
World Cup 6 in Dresden, Germany:
Men:
500 m:  Simon Cho  41.070  Liang Wenhao  41.196  Thibaut Fauconnet  41.250
Final standings: (1) Cho 3978 points (2) Fauconnet 3275 (3) Liang 2550
1000 m:  Song Weilong  1:25.553  Guillaume Bastille  1:26.733  Noh Jin-kyu  1:34.773
Final standings: (1) Fauconnet 4220 points (2) Noh 3152 (3) Travis Jayner  2411
5000 m relay:   (Robert Becker, Paul Herrmann, Torsten Kroeger, Robert Seifert) 6:44.466   (Kim Byeong-jun, Lee Ho-suk, Noh, Um Cheon-ho) 6:47.676   (Remi Beaulieu, Guillaume Blais Dufour, Michael Gilday, Olivier Jean) 6:47.687
Final standings: (1) Canada 3800 points (2) South Korea 2850 (3)  2460
Women:
500 m:  Marianne St-Gelais  43.091  Martina Valcepina  43.235  Liu Qiuhong  43.275
Final standings: (1) St-Gelais 5000 points (2) Liu 4250 (3) Zhao Nannan  3840
1000 m:  Yang Shin-young  1:30.659  Yui Sakai  1:30.741  Marie-Ève Drolet  1:30.852
Final standings: (1) Katherine Reutter  3136 points (2) Yang 3000 (3) Zhou Yang  2440
3000 m relay:   (Lana Gehring, Reutter, Emily Scott, Jessica Smith) 4:12.939   (Park Seung-hi, Yang, Cho Ha-ri, Hwang Hyun-sun) 4:13.037   (Drolet, Jessica Hewitt, Valérie Maltais, St-Gelais) 4:13.124
Final standings: (1)  4000 points (2) Canada 2880 (3) United States 2850

Skeleton
FIBT World Championships in Königssee, Germany:
Mixed team:   II (Michi Halilović, Sandra Kiriasis/Stephanie Schneider, Marion Thees, Francesco Friedrich/Florian Becke) 3:26.09 (51.40 / 51.60 / 52.82 / 50.27)   I (Frank Rommel, Cathleen Martini/Kristin Steinert, Anja Huber, Karl Angerer/Alex Mann) 3:26.15 (51.52 / 51.50 / 52.74 / 50.39)   I (Jon Montgomery, Kaillie Humphries/Heather Moyse, Mellisa Hollingsworth, Lyndon Rush/Neville Wright) 3:26.96 (51.54 / 51.40 / 53.67 / 50.35)
Germany win the event for the fourth successive time.

Snooker
Welsh Open in Newport, Wales:
Final: John Higgins  9–6 Stephen Maguire 
In the first All-Scottish final since the 2005 Malta Cup between Stephen Hendry and Graeme Dott, Higgins defends his title, winning the tournament for the third time and wins his 23rd ranking title.

Snowboarding
World Cup in Stoneham, Canada:
Men's Parallel Giant Slalom:  Benjamin Karl   Andreas Prommegger   Matthew Morison 
Parallel slalom standings (after 7 of 10 races): (1) Karl 4760 points (2) Prommegger 3700 (3) Roland Fischnaller  3400
Overall standings: (1) Karl 4760 points (2) Prommegger 3700 (3) Fischnaller 3400
Women's Parallel Giant Slalom:  Yekaterina Tudegesheva   Claudia Riegler   Marion Kreiner 
Parallel slalom standings (after 7 of 10 races): (1) Tudegesheva 4890 points (2) Fränzi Mägert-Kohli  3910 (3) Kreiner 3240
Overall standings: (1) Tudegesheva 4890 points (2) Mägert-Kohli 3910 (3) Kreiner 3240

Tennis
ATP World Tour:
Open 13 in Marseille, France:
Final: Robin Söderling  def. Marin Čilić  6–7(8), 6–3, 6–3
Söderling wins a tournament for the second successive week, and his third title of the year and ninth of his career.
Copa Claro in Buenos Aires, Argentina:
Final: Nicolás Almagro  def. Juan Ignacio Chela  6–3, 3–6, 6–4
Almagro wins a tournament for the second successive week, and his second title of the year and ninth of his career.
Regions Morgan Keegan Championships in Memphis, United States:
Final: Andy Roddick  def. Milos Raonic  7–6(7), 6–7(11), 7–5
Roddick wins the tournament for the third time, and his 30th career title.
WTA Tour:
Dubai Tennis Championships in Dubai, United Arab Emirates:
Final: Caroline Wozniacki  def. Svetlana Kuznetsova  6–1, 6–3
Wozniacki wins her 13th career title and regains the World number one ranking, seven days after Kim Clijsters  took the spot.
Copa BBVA-Colsanitas in Bogotá, Colombia:
Final: Lourdes Domínguez Lino  def. Mathilde Johansson  2–6, 6–3, 6–2
Dominguez Lino wins her second career title.

February 19, 2011 (Saturday)

Alpine skiing
World Championships in Garmisch-Partenkirchen, Germany:
Women's Slalom:  Marlies Schild  1:45.79 (52.69 / 53.10)  Kathrin Zettel  1:46.13 (53.30 / 52.83)  Maria Pietilä Holmner  1:46.44 (53.48 / 52.96)
Schild wins Austria's fourth title of the championships and the first gold medal in women's slalom since Karin Buder in 1993.

Auto racing
Nationwide Series:
DRIVE4COPD 300 in Daytona Beach, Florida: (1)  Tony Stewart (Chevrolet; Kevin Harvick Incorporated) (2)  Clint Bowyer (Chevrolet; Kevin Harvick Incorporated) (3)  Landon Cassill (Chevrolet; Phoenix Racing)
Stewart wins the race for the sixth time in seven years.

Badminton
European Mixed Team Championships in Amsterdam, Netherlands:
Semifinals:
 3–1 
 1–3

Basketball
ASEAN Basketball League Finals, game 2:
AirAsia Philippine Patriots  68–75  Chang Thailand Slammers. Chang Thailand Slammers win best-of-3 series 2–0.

Bobsleigh
FIBT World Championships in Königssee, Germany:
Two-woman:  Cathleen Martini/Romy Logsch  3:26.11 (51.36 / 51.41 / 51.69 / 51.65)  Shauna Rohbock/Valerie Fleming  3:26.33 (51.44 / 51.44 / 51.85 / 51.60)  Kaillie Humphries/Heather Moyse  3:26.74 (51.36 / 51.59 / 52.01 / 51.78)
Martini wins her first world title, and Logsch wins her third.
Two-man standings after 2 of 4 runs: (1) Alexandr Zubkov/Alexey Voyevoda  1:40.56 (2) Beat Hefti/Thomas Lamparter  1:40.62 (3) Thomas Florschütz/Kevin Kuske  1:40.67

Cricket
World Cup:
Group B:  370/4 (50 overs; Virender Sehwag 175, Virat Kohli 100*);  283/9 (50 overs) in Mirpur, Dhaka. India win by 87 runs.

Cross-country skiing
World Cup in Drammen, Norway:
Men's 15 km C:  Daniel Richardsson  37:19.1  Martin Johnsrud Sundby  37:48.1  Petter Northug  37:49.1
Distance standings (after 14 of 17 races): (1) Dario Cologna  531 points (2) Alexander Legkov  471 (3) Richardsson 466
Overall standings (after 24 of 31 races): (1) Cologna 1247 points (2) Northug 834 (3) Richardsson 781
Women's 10 km C:  Marit Bjørgen  27:31.9  Justyna Kowalczyk  27:49.2  Aino-Kaisa Saarinen  27:55.5
Distance standings (after 14 of 17 races): (1) Kowalczyk 867 points (2) Bjørgen 610 (3) Marianna Longa  481
Overall standings (after 24 of 31 races): (1) Kowalczyk 1656 points (2) Bjørgen 1022 (3) Arianna Follis  975

Figure skating
Four Continents Championships in Taipei, Chinese Taipei:
Ladies short program: (1) Miki Ando  66.58 (2) Mao Asada  63.41 (3) Rachael Flatt  62.23
Men:  Daisuke Takahashi  244.00  Yuzuru Hanyu  228.01  Jeremy Abbott  225.71
Takahashi wins the title for the second time in three years.

Football (soccer)
CONCACAF U-17 Championship in Montego Bay, Jamaica: (teams in bold advance to the quarter-finals)
Group C:  1–0 
Final standings: Jamaica,  4 points, Guatemala 0.
Group D:  0–0 
Final standings: Canada, Honduras 4 points,  0.
African Nations Championship in Sudan:
Quarter-finals:
 0–0 (8–9 pen.) 
 1–0

Freestyle skiing
World Cup in Minsk, Belarus:
Men's Aerials:  Anton Kushnir  256.31 points  Stanislav Kravchuk  244.49  Denis Osipau  237.42
Final aerials standings: (1) Qi Guangpu  461 points (2) Kushnir 428 (3) Renato Ulrich  321
Qi wins his first aerials World Cup title.
Overall standings: (1) Guilbaut Colas  77 points (2) Andreas Matt  71 (3) Qi 66
Women's Aerials:  Cheng Shuang  187.87 points  Ashley Caldwell  183.96  Kong Fanyu  178.28
Final aerials standings: (1) Cheng 442 points (2) Xu Mengtao  420 (3) Olha Volkova  343
Cheng wins her first aerials World Cup title.
Overall standings: (1) Hannah Kearney  87 points (2) Cheng 63 (3) Xu 60

Luge
World Cup in Sigulda, Latvia:
Men's:  Armin Zöggeler  1:36.998 (48.490 / 48.508)  Albert Demtschenko  1:37.289 (48.584 / 48.705)  Mārtiņš Rubenis  1:37.465 (48.681 / 48.784)
Final standings: (1) Zöggeler 765 points (2) Felix Loch  658 (3) Demtschenko 514
Zöggeler wins his sixth successive World Cup title, and his tenth overall, tying the record of Markus Prock .
Doubles:  Andreas Linger/Wolfgang Linger  1:24.209 (42.209 / 42.000)  Christian Oberstolz/Patrick Gruber  1:24.637 (42.387 / 42.250)  Toni Eggert/Sascha Benecken  1:24.712 (42.367 / 42.345)
Final standings: (1) Tobias Wendl/Tobias Arlt  746 points (2) Linger/Linger 692 (3) Oberstolz/Gruber 671
Wendl/Arlt win their first World Cup title.

Short track speed skating
World Cup 6 in Dresden, Germany:
Men:
500 m:  Thibaut Fauconnet  41.392  Simon Cho  41.406  Travis Jayner  42.834
Standings (after 7 of 8 races): (1) Cho 2978 points (2) Fauconnet 2635 (3) Han Jialiang  2134
1500 m:  Liu Xianwei  2:16.962  Lee Ho-Suk  2:17.176  Michael Gilday  2:17.378
Final standings: (1) Maxime Chataignier  2405 points (2) Liu 2358 (3) Gilday 2306
Women:
500 m:  Marianne St-Gelais  43.237  Liu Qiuhong  43.414  Martina Valcepina  44.252
Standings (after 7 of 8 races): (1) Liu 4020 points (2) St-Gelais 4000 (3) Zhao Nannan  3840
1500 m:  Yang Shin-young  2:21.724  Marie-Ève Drolet  2:21.813  Hwang Hyunsun  2:24.917
Final standings: (1) Katherine Reutter  4210 points (2) Zhou Yang  3490 (3) Cho Ha-Ri  2600

Snooker
Welsh Open in Newport, Wales, semi-finals:
John Higgins  6–2 Ali Carter 
Stephen Maguire  6–5 Mark Selby

Snowboarding
World Cup in Stoneham, Canada:
Big Air:  Sebastien Toutant  56.5 points  Matts Kulisek  51.0  Stefan Falkeis  50.6
Final Big Air standings: (1) Toutant 2220 points (2) Falkeis 1500 (3) Clemens Schattschneider  1360

Speed skating
World Cup 7 in Kearns, Utah, United States:
1500m women:  Marrit Leenstra  1:53.38  Ireen Wüst  1:53.75  Christine Nesbitt  1:54.16
Standings (after 5 of 6 races): (1) Nesbitt 470 points (2) Leenstra 346 (3) Wüst 310
10000m men:  Bob de Jong  12:53.17  Lee Seung-Hoon  12:57.27  Bob de Vries  13:01.83
Standings (after 5 of 6 races): (1) de Jong 460 points (2) Håvard Bøkko  286 (3) Ivan Skobrev  280

Tennis
WTA Tour:
Cellular South Cup in Memphis, United States:
Final: Magdaléna Rybáriková  def. Rebecca Marino  6–2 retired
Marino retires from her first WTA Tour final due to an abdominal injury, giving Rybáriková her second WTA Tour title.

February 18, 2011 (Friday)

Alpine skiing
World Championships in Garmisch-Partenkirchen, Germany:
Men's Giant slalom:  Ted Ligety  2:10.56 (1:02.33 / 1:08.23)  Cyprien Richard  2:10.64 (1:02.79 / 1:07.85)  Philipp Schörghofer  2:10.99 (1:02.13 / 1:08.86)
Ligety wins the United States' first men's alpine skiing world title since Bode Miller in Downhill and Super-G in 2005.

Badminton
European Mixed Team Championships in Amsterdam, Netherlands:
Quarterfinals:
 3–0 
 3–1 
 0–3 
 0–3

Bobsleigh
FIBT World Championships in Königssee, Germany:
Two-woman standings after 2 of 4 runs: (1) Cathleen Martini/Romy Logsch  1:42.77 (2) Shauna Rohbock/Valerie Fleming  1:42.88 (3) Kaillie Humphries/Heather Moyse  1:42.95

Figure skating
Four Continents Championships in Taipei, Chinese Taipei:
Men short program: (1) Daisuke Takahashi  83.49 points (2) Jeremy Abbott  76.73 (3) Yuzuru Hanyu  76.43
Pairs:  Pang Qing/Tong Jian  199.45 points  Meagan Duhamel/Eric Radford  181.79  Paige Lawrence/Rudi Swiegers  171.73
Pang/Tong win the title for the fifth time.
Ice dancing:  Meryl Davis/Charlie White  172.03 points  Maia Shibutani/Alex Shibutani  155.38  Vanessa Crone/Paul Poirier  151.83
Davis/White win the title for the second time in three years.
World and Olympic champions Tessa Virtue/Scott Moir  withdrew during the free dance after placing first in short dance.

Football (soccer)
CONCACAF U-17 Championship in Montego Bay, Jamaica: (teams in bold advance to the quarter-finals)
Group A:  3–2 
Final standings: Costa Rica 6 points, El Salvador 3,  0.
Group B:  1–0 
Final standings: United States 6 points, Panama,  1.
African Nations Championship in Sudan:
Quarter-finals:
 0–2 
 1–1 (4–3 pen.)

Snooker
Welsh Open in Newport, Wales, quarter-finals:
Mark Williams  3–5 Stephen Maguire 
Mark Selby  5–3 Graeme Dott 
John Higgins  5–3 Matthew Stevens 
Ali Carter  5–2 Ding Junhui

Snowboarding
World Cup in Stoneham, Canada:
Men's halfpipe:  Ryō Aono   Taku Hiraoka   Fujita Kazuumi 
Halfpipe standings (after 3 of 6 events): (1) Aono 1800 points (2) Nathan Johnstone  1260 (3) Tore Viken Holvik  1000
Women's halfpipe:  Cai Xuetong   Holly Crawford   Haruna Matsumoto

Speed skating
World Cup 7 in Kearns, Utah, United States:
1500m men:  Trevor Marsicano  1:43.35  Shani Davis  1:43.38  Mark Tuitert  1:43.54
Standings (after 5 of 6 races): (1) Marsicano 301 points (2) Davis 290 (3) Simon Kuipers  285
5000m women:  Martina Sáblíková  6:42.66 (WR)  Stephanie Beckert  6:47.03  Eriko Ishino  6:55.07
Standings (after 5 of 6 races): (1) Sáblíková 360 points (2) Beckert 355 (3) Jilleanne Rookard  276

February 17, 2011 (Thursday)

Alpine skiing
World Championships in Garmisch-Partenkirchen, Germany:
Women's Giant slalom:  Tina Maze  2:20.54 (1:07.05 / 1:13.49)  Federica Brignone  2:20.63 (1:07.39 / 1:13.24)  Tessa Worley  2:21.02 (1:09.17 / 1:11.85)
Maze becomes the first Slovenian alpine skier to win a world title.

Auto racing
Sprint Cup Series:
Gatorade Duels in Daytona Beach, Florida:
Duel 1: (1)  Kurt Busch (Dodge; Penske Racing) (2)  Regan Smith (Chevrolet; Furniture Row Racing) (3)  Kevin Harvick (Chevrolet; Richard Childress Racing)
Duel 2: (1)  Jeff Burton (Chevrolet; Richard Childress Racing) (2)  Clint Bowyer (Chevrolet; Richard Childress Racing) (3)  Michael Waltrip (Toyota; Michael Waltrip Racing)

Basketball
Euroleague Top 16, matchday 4: (teams in bold advance to quarterfinals, teams in strike are eliminated)
Group E:
Panathinaikos Athens  76–74  Caja Laboral
Lietuvos Rytas  70–65  Unicaja Málaga
Standings (after 4 games): Panathinaikos Athens 3–1; Lietuvos Rytas, Caja Laboral 2–2; Unicaja Málaga 1–3.
Group F:
Virtus Roma  65–74  Regal FC Barcelona
Union Olimpija Ljubljana  65–83  Maccabi Tel Aviv
Standings (after 4 games): Regal FC Barcelona 4–0; Maccabi Tel Aviv 3–1; Union Olimpija Ljubljana 1–3; Virtus Roma 0–4.
Group G:  Efes Pilsen Istanbul 60–77  Real Madrid
Standings (after 4 games): Real Madrid 4–0;  Montepaschi Siena, Efes Pilsen Istanbul 2–2;  Partizan Belgrade 0–4.
Group H: Power Electronics Valencia  79–85  Olympiacos Piraeus
Standings (after 4 games):  Fenerbahçe Ülker, Olympiacos Piraeus 3–1; Power Electronics Valencia,  Žalgiris Kaunas 1–3.

Darts
Premier League, week 2 in Nottingham, England:
Simon Whitlock  3–8 Raymond van Barneveld 
James Wade  8–6 Adrian Lewis 
Phil Taylor  8–5 Mark Webster 
Terry Jenkins  4–8 Gary Anderson 
High Checkout: Webster 170
Standings (after 2 matches): Anderson 4 points, Lewis, van Barneveld, Webster, Jenkins, Wade, Taylor 2, Whitlock 0.

Figure skating
Four Continents Championships in Taipei, Chinese Taipei:
Short dance: (1) Tessa Virtue/Scott Moir  69.40 points (2) Meryl Davis/Charlie White  69.01 (3) Kaitlyn Weaver/Andrew Poje  65.45
Pairs short program: (1) Pang Qing/Tong Jian  71.41 points (2) Paige Lawrence/Rudi Swiegers  59.98 (3) Meagan Duhamel/Eric Radford  59.92

Football (soccer)
CONCACAF U-17 Championship in Montego Bay, Jamaica: (teams in bold advance to the quarter-finals, team in strike is eliminated)
Group C:  0–1 
Standings: Trinidad and Tobago 4 points (2 matches),  1 (1), Guatemala 0 (1).
Group D:  8–0 
Standings: Canada,  3 points (1 match), Barbados 0 (2).
UEFA Europa League Round of 32, first leg:
Rubin Kazan  0–2  Twente
Metalist Kharkiv  0–4  Bayer Leverkusen
Napoli  0–0  Villarreal
Anderlecht  0–3  Ajax
Lech Poznań  1–0  Braga
Beşiktaş  1–4  Dynamo Kyiv
Benfica  2–1  Stuttgart
BATE  2–2  Paris Saint-Germain
Rangers  1–1  Sporting CP
Sparta Prague  0–0  Liverpool
Basel  2–3  Spartak Moscow
Young Boys  2–1  Zenit St. Petersburg
PAOK  0–1  CSKA Moscow
Sevilla  1–2  Porto
Lille  2–2  PSV Eindhoven
Copa Libertadores Second Stage:
Group 2:
León de Huánuco  1–2  Junior
Grêmio  3–0  Oriente Petrolero
Group 5: Cerro Porteño  5–2  Colo-Colo
Group 8: Godoy Cruz  2–1  LDU Quito

Snooker
Welsh Open in Newport, Wales, last 16:
Mark Williams  4–0 Jamie Cope 
Ali Carter  4–1 Peter Ebdon 
Ryan Day  3–4 Matthew Stevens 
Mark Allen  3–4 Ding Junhui 
Graeme Dott  4–1 Neil Robertson 
Stephen Hendry  2–4 Stephen Maguire 
Hendry compiles the 10th maximum break of his career and now shares the record with Ronnie O'Sullivan, and becomes the oldest player to compile it at the age of 42 years and 35 days.

Snowboarding
World Cup in Stoneham, Canada:
Men's Snowboard Cross:  Nick Baumgartner   Jonathan Cheever   David Speiser 
Snowboard Cross standings (after 4 of 6 races): (1) Alex Pullin  1770 points (2) Cheever 1690 (3) Pierre Vaultier  1590
Overall standings: (1) Benjamin Karl  3910 points (2) Roland Fischnaller  3120 (3) Andreas Prommegger  3100
Women's Snowboard Cross:  Lindsey Jacobellis   Dominique Maltais   Déborah Anthonioz 
Snowboard Cross standings (after 4 of 6 races): (1) Maltais 3800 points (2) Maëlle Ricker  2200 (3) Aleksandra Zhekova  1960
Overall standings: (1) Yekaterina Tudegesheva  4180 points (2) Fränzi Mägert-Kohli  3910 (3) Maltais 3800

February 16, 2011 (Wednesday)

Alpine skiing
World Championships in Garmisch-Partenkirchen, Germany:
Nations team event:   (Tessa Worley, Taïna Barioz, Anemone Marmottan, Cyprien Richard, Gauthier de Tessières, Thomas Fanara)   (Anna Fenninger, Michaela Kirchgasser, Marlies Schild, Romed Baumann, Benjamin Raich, Philipp Schörghofer)   (Sara Hector, Anja Pärson, Maria Pietilä Holmner, Axel Bäck, Hans Olsson, Matts Olsson)
France become the third different country to win the team event since its début in 2005.

Basketball
Euroleague Top 16, matchday 4:
Group G: Montepaschi Siena  77–74  Partizan Belgrade
Standings:  Real Madrid 3–0;  Efes Pilsen Istanbul 2–1; Montepaschi Siena 2–2; Partizan Belgrade 0–4.
Group H: Žalgiris Kaunas  85–84 (OT)  Fenerbahçe Ülker
Standings: Fenerbahçe Ülker 3–1;  Olympiacos Piraeus 2–1;  Power Electronics Valencia 1–2; Žalgiris Kaunas 1–3.

Football (soccer)
CONCACAF U-17 Championship in Montego Bay, Jamaica: (teams in bold advance to the quarter-finals, team in strike is eliminated)
Group A:  3–0 ; Haiti was forced to forfeit due to an illness that struck the team.
Standings: El Salvador,  3 points (1 match), Haiti 0 (2).
Group B:  0–0 
Standings:  3 points (1 match), Panama 1 (1), Cuba 1 (2).
UEFA Champions League Round of 16, first leg:
Arsenal  2–1  Barcelona
Roma  2–3  Shakhtar Donetsk
Copa Libertadores Second Stage:
Group 1: Once Caldas  0–3  Universidad San Martín
Group 4: Unión Española  2–2  Universidad Católica
Group 6:
Emelec  1–1  Internacional
Jaguares  2–0  Jorge Wilstermann
Group 7: Cruzeiro  5–0  Estudiantes

Snooker
Welsh Open in Newport, Wales:
Last 32:
Shaun Murphy  0–4 Matthew Stevens 
Stephen Hendry  4–0 Joe Perry 
Stephen Maguire  4–2 Gerard Greene 
Ronnie O'Sullivan  2–4 Ryan Day 
Last 16:
John Higgins  4–1 Dave Harold 
Mark Selby  4–2 Mark King

February 15, 2011 (Tuesday)

Football (soccer)
CONCACAF U-17 Championship in Montego Bay, Jamaica:
Group C:  2–2 
Group D:  1–2 
UEFA Champions League Round of 16, first leg:
Milan  0–1  Tottenham Hotspur
Valencia  1–1  Schalke 04
Schalke's Raúl becomes the most prolific goal scorer in European club competitions, scoring his 71st goal to surpass Filippo Inzaghi.
UEFA Europa League Round of 32, first leg: Aris  0–0  Manchester City
Copa Libertadores Second Stage:
Group 1: San Luis  1–2  Libertad
Group 3: América  2–0  Nacional
Group 4: Vélez Sársfield  3–0  Caracas
Group 5: Deportivo Táchira  0–0  Santos
Group 7: Deportes Tolima  1–0  Guaraní

Snooker
Welsh Open in Newport, Wales, last 32:
Mark Williams  4–0 Marco Fu 
Mark Allen  4–1 Rod Lawler 
Mark Selby  4–3 Stuart Bingham 
Peter Ebdon  4–2 Dominic Dale 
Graeme Dott  4–1 Jamie Burnett 
Neil Robertson  4–2 Nigel Bond

February 14, 2011 (Monday)

Alpine skiing
World Championships in Garmisch-Partenkirchen, Germany:
Men's super combined:  Aksel Lund Svindal  2:54.51 (1:59.49 / 55.02)  Christof Innerhofer  2:55.52 (2:00.67 / 54.85)  Peter Fill  2:56.41 (2:00.83 / 55.58)
Svindal retains his world title, becoming the first man to do so since compatriot Kjetil André Aamodt won three successive combined titles between 1997 and 2001.

Football (soccer)
CONCACAF U-17 Championship in Montego Bay, Jamaica:
Group A:  1–3 
Group B:  1–3

Snooker
Welsh Open in Newport, Wales, last 32:
Ding Junhui  4–3 Marcus Campbell 
Ricky Walden  3–4 Dave Harold 
Ali Carter  4–3 Barry Hawkins 
John Higgins  4–3 Jack Lisowski 
Mark King  4–1 Michael Holt 
Jamie Cope  4–3 Rory McLeod

February 13, 2011 (Sunday)

Alpine skiing
World Championships in Garmisch-Partenkirchen, Germany:
Women's Downhill:  Elisabeth Görgl  1:47.24  Lindsey Vonn  1:47.68  Maria Riesch  1:47.84
Görgl wins her second title of the championships and the third for Austrian women, and denies Vonn a second successive title in downhill.

Auto racing
World Rally Championship:
Rally Sweden in Karlstad, Sweden: (1) Mikko Hirvonen /Jarmo Lehtinen  (Ford Fiesta RS WRC) 3:23:56.6 (2) Mads Østberg /Jonas Andersson  (Ford Fiesta RS WRC) 3:24:03.1 (3) Jari-Matti Latvala /Miikka Anttila  (Ford Fiesta RS WRC) 3:24:30.6

Basketball
ASEAN Basketball League Finals, game 1:
Chang Thailand Slammers  66–58  AirAsia Philippine Patriots
Chang Thailand Slammers lead best-of-3 series 1–0.
 Italian Cup Final in Turin:
Montepaschi Siena 79–72 Bennet Cantù
Montepaschi Siena win the Cup for the third successive time.
 Spanish Cup Final in Madrid:
Real Madrid 60–68 Regal FC Barcelona
Regal FC Barcelona win the Cup for the second successive time and 22nd overall.
 Turkish Cup Final in Kayseri:
Beşiktaş Cola Turka 72–81 Fenerbahçe Ülker
Fenerbahçe Ülker win the Cup for the second successive time and third overall.
 Semaine des As Cup Final in Pau:
Gravelines 79–71 Chalon-sur-Saône

Biathlon
World Cup 8 in Fort Kent, United States:
Men's 15 km Mass Start:  Martin Fourcade  39:48.9 (0+0+2+0)  Tomasz Sikora  39:52.0 (0+0+0+0)  Tarjei Bø  39:53.6 (0+0+1+1)
Mass Start standings (after 3 of 5 races): (1) Fourcade 163 points (2) Bø 134 (3) Emil Hegle Svendsen  124
Overall standings (after 19 of 26 races): (1) Bø 823 points (2) Svendsen 750 (3) Fourcade 724
Women's 12.5 km Mass Start:  Magdalena Neuner  39:30.6 (0+0+0+1)  Andrea Henkel  39:54.2 (0+0+1+0)  Darya Domracheva  39:59.3 (1+0+0+0)
Mass Start standings (after 3 of 5 races): (1) Henkel 134 points (2) Tora Berger  133 (3) Neuner 130
Overall standings (after 19 of 26 races): (1) Henkel 753 points (2) Kaisa Mäkäräinen  744 (3) Helena Ekholm  723

Field hockey
Men's Indoor World Cup in Poznań, Poland:
Bronze medal match:  0–5  
Gold medal match:   3–2 (ET)  
Germany win the title for the third successive time.
Women's Indoor World Cup in Poznań, Poland:
Bronze medal match:  2–4  
Gold medal match:   2–4  
Germany win the title for the second time.

Golf
PGA Tour:
AT&T Pebble Beach National Pro-Am in Pebble Beach, California:
Winner: D. A. Points  271 (−15)
Points wins his first PGA Tour title.
European Tour:
Dubai Desert Classic in Dubai, United Arab Emirates:
Winner: Álvaro Quirós  277 (−11)
Quirós wins his fifth European Tour title.
Champions Tour:
Allianz Championship in Boca Raton, Florida:
Winner: Tom Lehman  203 (−13)
Lehman wins his third Champions Tour title.

Luge
World Cup in Paramonovo, Russia:
Men:  Albert Demtschenko  1:41.116 (50.420 / 50.696)  Felix Loch  1:41.584 (51.006 / 50.578)  Andi Langenhan  1:41.738 (50.821 / 50.917)
Standings (after 8 of 9 races): (1) Armin Zöggeler  665 points (2) Loch 630 (3) David Möller  466

Rugby union
Six Nations Championship, week 2:
 22–25  in Dublin
Standings (after 2 matches): , France 4 points, Ireland 2,  0.
IRB Sevens World Series:
USA Sevens in Whitney, Nevada:
Shield:  19–12 
Bowl:  14–19 
Plate:  15–26 
Cup:  24–14 
Standings (after 4 of 8 events): (1)  &  80 points (3) Fiji & Samoa 64.

Short track speed skating
World Cup 5 in Moscow, Russia:
Men's:
500 m:  Simon Cho  42.157  Paul Stanley  42.274  Freek van der Wart  42.345
Standings (after 6 of 8 races): (1) Cho 2010 points (2) Charles Hamelin  1722 points (3) Thibaut Fauconnet  1635
1000 m:  Noh Jin-Kyu  1:26.661  Fauconnet 1:26.774  Travis Jayner  1:27.022
Standings (after 7 of 8 races): (1) Fauconnet 2800 points (2) Noh 2512 (3) Jayner 2080
5000 m relay:   (Sjinkie Knegt, van der Wart, Niels Kerstholt, Daan Breeuwsma) 6:52.216   (Fauconnet, Maxime Chataignier, Sébastien Lepape, Jeremy Masson) 6:52.609   (François Hamelin, Olivier Jean, Guillaume Blais Dufour, Michael Gilday) 7:00.055
Standings (after 5 of 6 races): (1) Canada 3000 points (2)  2240 (3)  & Netherlands 2050
Women's:
500 m:  Marianne St-Gelais  43.612  Liu Qiuhong  44.026  Martina Valcepina  44.459
Standings (after 6 of 8 races): (1) Zhao Nannan  & St-Gelais 3000 points (3) Liu 2400
1000 m:  Katherine Reutter  1:32.076  Hwang Hyunsun  1:32.197  Kim Dam Min  1:32.264
Standings (after 7 of 8 races): (1) Reutter 2800 points (2) Zhou Yang  2440 (3) Yang Shin-young  2000
3000 m relay:   (Zhang Hui, Liu, Fan Kexin, Li Jiranrou) 4:12.308   (St-Gelais, Marie-Ève Drolet, Jessica Hewitt, Jessica Gregg) 4:12.687   (Arianna Fontana, Cecilia Maffei, Valcepina, Elena Viviani) 4:20.731
Standings (after 5 of 6 races): (1) China 3000 points (2) Canada 2240 (3)  2010

Ski jumping
World Cup in Vikersund, Norway:
HS 225 (Ski flying):  Gregor Schlierenzauer  487.5 points  Johan Remen Evensen  476.7  Adam Małysz  447.8
Ski flying standings (after 5 of 7 events): (1) Schlierenzauer 325 points (2) Martin Koch  301 (3) Thomas Morgenstern  262
Overall standings (after 23 of 26 events): (1) Morgenstern 1596 points (2) Simon Ammann  1209 (3) Małysz 1045
Morgenstern wins his second World Cup title.

Snowboarding
World Cup in Yabuli, China:
Men's halfpipe:  Nathan Johnstone   Zhang Yiwei   Shi Wancheng 
Halfpipe standings (after 2 of 6 races): (1) Tore Viken Holvik  & Johnstone 1000 points (3) Ryō Aono  & Zhang 800
Freestyle overall standings: (1) Sebastien Toutant  1220 points (2) Rocco van Straten  1185 (3) Seppe Smits  1180
Women's halfpipe:  Liu Jiayu   Cai Xuetong   Li Shuang 
Halfpipe standings (after 2 of 6 races): (1) Cai 1800 points (2) Liu 1000 (3) Chen Xu  810
Freestyle overall standings: (1) Cai 1800 points (2) Liu 1000 (3) Chen 810

Speed skating
World Allround Championships in Calgary, Canada:
Men:
1500 m: (1) Ivan Skobrev  1:42.94 (2) Jonathan Kuck  1:43.12 (3) Brian Hansen  1:43.35
10000 m: (1) Håvard Bøkko  12:53.89 (2) Skobrev 12:58.36 (3) Jan Blokhuijsen  13:00.04
Final standings:  Skobrev 146.230 points  Bøkko 146.408  Blokhuijsen 146.603
Skobrev becomes the first Russian champion since the break-up of Soviet Union.
Women:
1500 m: (1) Ireen Wüst  1:52.59 (2) Christine Nesbitt  1:53.22 (3) Marrit Leenstra  1:53.88
5000 m: (1) Stephanie Beckert  6:49.51 (2) Wüst 6:55.85 (3) Masako Hozumi  6:56.35
Final standings:  Wüst 157.313 points  Nesbitt 158.939  Martina Sáblíková  159.288
Wüst wins her second world title.

Tennis
ATP World Tour:
ABN AMRO World Tennis Tournament in Rotterdam, Netherlands:
Final: Robin Söderling  def. Jo-Wilfried Tsonga  6–3, 3–6, 6–3
Söderling retains his title, winning his second title of the year, and the eighth of his career.
SAP Open in San Jose, United States:
Final: Milos Raonic  def. Fernando Verdasco  7–6(6), 7–6(5)
Raonic becomes the first Canadian to win a singles title since Greg Rusedski at the 1995 Seoul Open.
WTA Tour:
Open GDF Suez in Paris, France:
Final: Petra Kvitová  def. Kim Clijsters  6–4, 6–3
Kvitová wins her second title of the year and third career title.
PTT Pattaya Open in Pattaya, Thailand:
Final: Daniela Hantuchová  def. Sara Errani  6–0, 6–2
Hantuchová wins her fourth career title.

February 12, 2011 (Saturday)

Alpine skiing
World Championships in Garmisch-Partenkirchen, Germany:
Men's Downhill:  Erik Guay  1:58.41  Didier Cuche  1:58.73  Christof Innerhofer  1:59.17
Guay becomes the second successive Canadian to win the men's downhill, after John Kucera's win in 2009.

Auto racing
Sprint Cup Series:
Budweiser Shootout in Daytona Beach, Florida: (1)  Kurt Busch (Dodge, Penske Racing) (2)  Jamie McMurray (Chevrolet, Earnhardt Ganassi Racing) (3)  Ryan Newman (Chevrolet, Stewart Haas Racing)
Busch wins the Shootout for the first time.
V8 Supercars:
Yas V8 400 in Yas Marina, United Arab Emirates:
Race 2: (1) James Courtney  (Holden Racing Team, Holden VE Commodore) (2) Jason Bright  (Brad Jones Racing, Holden VE Commodore) (3) Jamie Whincup  (Triple Eight Race Engineering, Holden VE Commodore)
Drivers' championship standings (after 2 of 27 races): (1) Whincup 279 points (2) Alex Davison  (Stone Brothers Racing, Ford FG Falcon) 234 (3) Shane van Gisbergen  (Stone Brothers Racing, Ford FG Falcon) 210

Basketball
 Polish Cup Final in Gdynia:
Anwil Włocławek 67–75 Polpharma Starogard Gdański
 Serbian Cup Final in Belgrade:
FMP 73–77 Partizan
Partizan win the Cup for the fourth successive time and 12th overall.

Biathlon
World Cup 8 in Fort Kent, United States:
Men's 12.5 km Pursuit:  Emil Hegle Svendsen  35:46.0 (0+0+0+1)  Martin Fourcade  35:46.0 (0+0+1+0)  Tarjei Bø  37:03.5 (1+0+0+2)
Pursuit standings (after 5 of 7 races): (1) Bø 232 points (2) Fourcade 212 (3) Svendsen 190
Overall standings (after 18 of 26 races): (1) Bø 775 points (2) Svendsen 712 (3) Fourcade 664
Women's 10 km Pursuit:  Andrea Henkel  31:09.1 (0+0+1+0)  Magdalena Neuner  31:33.9 (2+0+0+1)  Marie Dorin  32:02.7 (0+0+0+0)
Pursuit standings (after 5 of 7 races): (1) Kaisa Mäkäräinen  240 points (2) Henkel 212 (3) Helena Ekholm  206
Overall standings (after 18 of 26 races): (1) Mäkäräinen 704 points (2) Henkel 699 (3) Ekholm 685

Equestrianism
Show jumping:
FEI World Cup:
Western European League:
11th competition in Vigo (CSI 5*-W):  Michel Robert  on Kellemoi de Pepita  Kevin Staut  on Silvana  Malin Baryard-Johnsson  on Tornesch
Standings (after 11 of 13 competitions): (1) Staut 87 points (2) Meredith Michaels-Beerbaum  73 (3) Rolf-Göran Bengtsson  73
North American League – East Coast:
13th competition in Wellington, Florida (CSI 3*-W):  Laura Kraut  on Cedric  McLain Ward  on Antares F  Pablo Barrios  on Quick Star
North American League – West Coast:
13th competition in Thermal, California (CSI 2*-W):  Eduardo Menezes  on Tomba  John Perez  on La Cantera Utopia  Meredith Michaels-Beerbaum  on Kismet

Football (soccer)
South American Youth Championship in Peru: (teams in bold qualify for 2012 Olympic tournament, teams in italics qualify for U-20 World Cup)
Final stage, matchday 5:
 0–2 
 1–0 
 6–0 
Final standings: Brazil 12 points, Uruguay 10, Argentina 9, Ecuador 8, Chile 3, Colombia 1.
Brazil win the title for the third successive time and 11th overall.
Colombia qualify for U-20 World Cup as host.

Freestyle skiing
World Cup in Moscow, Russia:
Men's Aerials:  Anton Kushnir  119.91 points  Stanislav Kravchuk  102.57  Qi Guangpu  102.57
Aerials standings (after 6 of 7 events): (1) Qi 421 points (2) Kushnir 328 (3) Jia Zongyang  288
Overall standings: (1) Guilbaut Colas  77 points (2) Andreas Matt  71 (3) Qi 70
Women's Aerials:  Emily Cook  93.06 points  Olha Volkova  85.83  Zhang Xin  84.10
Aerials standings (after 6 of 7 events): (1) Xu Mengtao  420 points (2) Cheng Shuang  342 (3) Volkova 293
Overall standings: (1) Hannah Kearney  87 points (2) Xu 70 (3) Jennifer Heil  & Heidi Zacher  59

Luge
World Cup in Paramonovo, Russia:
Doubles:  Andreas Linger/Wolfgang Linger  1:33.189 (46.692 / 46.497)  Tobias Wendl/Tobias Arlt  1:33.393 (46.666 / 46.727)  Andris Šics/Juris Šics  1:33.450 (46.760 / 46.890)
Standings (after 8 of 9 races): (1) Wendl/Arlt 700 points (2) Linger/Linger 592 (3) Christian Oberstolz/Patrick Gruber  586
Wendl and Arlt win their first World Cup title.
Women:  Alex Gough  1:33.536 (46.782 / 46.754)  Carina Schwab  1:33.914 (46.939 / 46.975)  Natalie Geisenberger  1:33.935 (47.095 / 46.840)
Gough becomes the first non-German to win a World Cup race since Andrea Tagwerker  in 1997, ending a winning streak of 105 races for German lugers.
Standings (after 8 of 9 races): (1) Tatjana Hüfner  745 points (2) Geisenberger 630 (3) Anke Wischnewski  535
Hüfner wins her fourth consecutive World Cup title.

Mixed martial arts
Strikeforce: Fedor vs. Silva in East Rutherford, New Jersey, United States:
Heavyweight Grand Prix quarterfinal bout: Antônio Silva  def. Fedor Emelianenko  via TKO (doctor stoppage)
Heavyweight Grand Prix quarterfinal bout: Sergei Kharitonov  def. Andrei Arlovski  via KO (punches)
Silva and Kharitonov advance to the Heavyweight Grand Prix semifinals.
Heavyweight Grand Prix reserve bout: Shane del Rosario  def. Lavar Johnson  via submission (armbar)
Heavyweight Grand Prix reserve bout: Chad Griggs  def. Gianpiero Villante  via TKO (punches)
Heavyweight Grand Prix reserve bout: Valentijn Overeem  def. Ray Sefo  via submission (neck crank)

Rugby union
Six Nations Championship, week 2:
 59–13  in London
 6–24  in Edinburgh
Standings: England 4 points (2 matches),  2 (1), Wales 2 (2),  2 (1), Scotland, Italy 0 (2).
European Nations Cup First Division, week 2:
 60–0  in Tbilisi
 19–21  in Sochi
 –  in Kyiv — postponed due to bad weather.
Standings: Georgia 10 points (2 matches), Portugal 8 (2), Russia 5 (2), Romania 1 (1), Spain 1 (2), Ukraine 0 (1).

Short track speed skating
World Cup 5 in Moscow, Russia:
Men's:
1000 m:  Kim Byeong-jun  1:26.726  François Hamelin  1:27.068  Liang Wenhao  1:27.389
Standings (after 6 of 8 races): (1) Thibaut Fauconnet  2800 points (2) Kim 2000 (3) Travis Jayner  1702
1500 m:  Noh Jin-kyu  2:14.305  Travis Jayner  2:15.278  Michael Gilday  2:15.383
Standings (after 7 of 8 races): (1) Noh 2035 points (2) Maxime Chataignier  1920 (3) Jeff Simon  1850
Women's:
1000 m:  Yang Shin-young  1:32.640  Hwang Hyun-sun  1:32.733  Li Jiranrou  1:33.110
Standings (after 6 of 8 races): (1) Zhou Yang  2440 points (2) Yang 2000 (3) Katherine Reutter  1968
1500 m:  Katherine Reutter  2:23.535  Cho Ha-ri  2:23.720  Kim Dam-min  2:23.928
Standings (after 7 of 8 races): (1) Reutter 3000 points (2) Cho 2600 (3) Zhou Yang  2440

Ski jumping
World Cup in Vikersund, Norway:
HS 225 (Ski flying):  Gregor Schlierenzauer  & Johan Remen Evensen  498.6 points  Simon Ammann  452.0
Ski flying standings (after 4 of 7 events): (1) Martin Koch  265 points (2) Schlierenzauer 225 (3) Thomas Morgenstern  217
Overall standings (after 22 of 26 events): (1) Morgenstern 1551 points (2) Ammann 1159 (3) Andreas Kofler  1016

Speed skating
World Allround Championships in Calgary, Canada:
Men:
500 m: (1) Shani Davis  35.08 (2) Brian Hansen  35.33 (3) Konrad Niedźwiedzki  35.35
5000 m: (1) Ivan Skobrev  6:10.99 (2) Koen Verweij  6:12.20 (3) Håvard Bøkko   6:12.98
Standings after day 1: (1) Verweij 72.860 points (2) Skobrev 72.999 (3) Jan Blokhuijsen  73.008
Women:
500 m: (1) Christine Nesbitt  37.72 (2) Karolína Erbanová  38.22 (3) Ireen Wüst  & Marrit Leenstra  38.53
3000 m: (1) Martina Sáblíková  3:55.55 (2) Wüst 3:58.01 (3) Stephanie Beckert  4:00.77
Standings after day 1: (1) Wüst 78.198 points (2) Nesbitt 78.293 (3) Sáblíková 78.748

Tennis
ATP World Tour:
Brasil Open in Costa do Sauípe, Brazil:
Final: Nicolás Almagro  def. Alexandr Dolgopolov  6–3, 7–6(3)
Almagro wins his eighth career title, and second win at the event, also winning in 2008.

February 11, 2011 (Friday)

Alpine skiing
World Championships in Garmisch-Partenkirchen, Germany:
Women's super combined:  Anna Fenninger  2:43.23 (1:49.67 / 53.56)  Tina Maze  2:43.32 (1:50.38 / 52.94)  Anja Pärson  2:43.50 (1:49.54 / 53.96)
Fenninger repeats her teammate Kathrin Zettel's victory from 2009, and becomes the sixth Austrian to win the women's super combined title.

Auto racing
V8 Supercars:
Yas V8 400 in Yas Marina, United Arab Emirates:
Race 1: (1) Jamie Whincup  (Triple Eight Race Engineering, Holden VE Commodore) (2) Alex Davison  (Stone Brothers Racing, Ford FG Falcon) (3) Mark Winterbottom  (Ford Performance Racing, Ford FG Falcon)

Biathlon
World Cup 8 in Fort Kent, United States:
Women's 7.5 km Sprint:  Andrea Henkel  23:20.0 (0+0)  Miriam Gössner  23:30.9 (0+2)  Magdalena Neuner  23:35.8 (1+1)
Sprint standings (after 8 of 10 races): (1) Kaisa Mäkäräinen  315 points (2) Henkel 292 (3) Neuner 284
Overall standings (after 17 of 26 races): (1) Mäkäräinen 664 points (2) Helena Ekholm  656 (3) Henkel 639

Freestyle skiing
World Cup in Blue Mountain, Canada:
Men's Ski Cross:  Christopher Del Bosco   Andreas Matt   Tomáš Kraus 
Ski Cross standings (after 7 of 11 events): (1) Matt 499 points (2) Del Bosco 325 (3) Nick Zoricic  239
Overall standings: (1) Guilbaut Colas  77 points (2) Qi Guangpu  72 (3) Matt 71
Women's Ski Cross:  Anna Wörner   Fanny Smith   Jenny Owens 
Ski Cross standings (after 7 of 11 events): (1) Heidi Zacher  412 points (2) Kelsey Serwa  374 (3) Anna Holmlund  372
Overall standings: (1) Hannah Kearney  87 points (2) Xu Mengtao  84 (3) Cheng Shuang  63

Ski jumping
Johan Remen Evensen  twice breaks the world record for the longest ski jump during qualification for the World Cup event in Vikersund, Norway. Evensen advances the record to 246.5 metres, 7.5 longer than the old mark set by teammate Bjørn Einar Romøren at Planica in 2005.

Tennis
Kim Clijsters  defeats Jelena Dokić  6–3, 6–0 in the quarterfinals of Open GDF Suez in Paris to become the World no. 1 on the WTA rankings next Monday. She is the first ever mother at the top of the standings.

February 10, 2011 (Thursday)

Basketball
 Israeli State Cup Final in Tel Aviv:
Maccabi Tel Aviv 106–70 Barak Netanya
Maccabi Tel Aviv win the Cup for the second straight time and 38th overall. Four players, two of each team, are ejected following a brawl in the third period. The margin of victory is the third largest in Cup finals history.
NBA news:
Jerry Sloan, head coach of the Utah Jazz since 1988 and the longest-tenured head coach in any of North America's four major leagues, announces his resignation effective immediately. Assistant Tyrone Corbin is named as Sloan's permanent replacement.
In the Boston Celtics' 92–86 loss to the Los Angeles Lakers, the Celtics' Ray Allen becomes the NBA's all-time leader in career three-pointers, surpassing Reggie Miller.

Biathlon
World Cup 8 in Fort Kent, United States:
Men's 10 km Sprint:  Emil Hegle Svendsen  24:51.4 (0+1)  Michal Šlesingr  24:58.6 (0+0)  Tarjei Bø  25:00.7 (0+0)
Sprint standings (after 8 of 10 races): (1) Bø 345 points (2) Svendsen 291 (3) Michael Greis  254
Overall standings (after 17 of 26 races): (1) Bø 727 points (2) Svendsen 652 (3) Martin Fourcade  610

Darts
Premier League, week 1 in London, England:
Mark Webster  8–3 James Wade 
Gary Anderson  8–5 Simon Whitlock 
Raymond van Barneveld  6–8 Terry Jenkins 
Adrian Lewis  8–2 Phil Taylor 
High Checkout: Anderson 120

February 9, 2011 (Wednesday)

Alpine skiing
World Championships in Garmisch-Partenkirchen, Germany:
Men's super-G:  Christof Innerhofer  1:38.31  Hannes Reichelt  1:38.91  Ivica Kostelić  1:39.03
Innerhofer becomes the second Italian to win the men's super-G title after Patrick Staudacher in 2007.

Football (soccer)
Nations Cup in Dublin, Republic of Ireland:
 0–3 
Friendly internationals: (top 10 in FIFA World Rankings)
(1)  1–0 
(2)  3–1 
(3)  1–1 
 1–0 (4) 
(5)  2–1 (8)  in Geneva, Switzerland
 1–2 (6) 
(9)  4–2 
(10)  1–0 
South American Youth Championship in Peru: (team in bold qualify for 2012 Olympic tournament, teams in italics qualify for U-20 World Cup)
Final stage, matchday 4:
 1–3 
 0–1 
 1–0 
Standings (after 4 matches): Uruguay 10 points, Brazil 9, Argentina 6, Ecuador 5, Chile 3, Colombia 1.
Colombia qualify for U-20 World Cup as host.
Copa Libertadores Second Stage:
Group 3: Fluminense  2–2  Argentinos Juniors

Golf
Frank Chirkinian, executive producer for CBS Sports' televised golf coverage from 1959 to 1996, is announced as part of the 2011 induction class of the World Golf Hall of Fame. He will be formally enshrined alongside five other inductees on May 9.

Snowboarding
World Cup in Yongpyong, South Korea:
Men's parallel giant slalom:  Benjamin Karl   Siegfried Grabner   Aaron March 
Parallel slalom standings (after 6 of 10 races): (1) Karl 3910 points (2) Roland Fischnaller  3120 (3) Andreas Prommegger  and March 3100
Overall standings: (1) Karl 3910 points (2) Fischnaller 3120 (3) Prommegger & March 3100
Women's parallel giant slalom:  Marion Kreiner   Fränzi Mägert-Kohli   Svetlana Boldykova 
Parallel slalom standings (after 6 of 10 races): (1) Yekaterina Tudegesheva  4180 points (2) Mägert-Kohli 3910 (3) Kreiner 2640
Overall standings: (1) Tudegesheva 4180 points (2) Mägert-Kohli 3910 (3) Dominique Maltais  3000

February 8, 2011 (Tuesday)

Alpine skiing
World Championships in Garmisch-Partenkirchen, Germany:
Women's Super-G:  Elisabeth Görgl  1:23.82  Julia Mancuso  1:23.87  Maria Riesch  1:24.03
Görgl wins her first World Championship title.

Football (soccer)
Nations Cup in Dublin, Republic of Ireland:
 3–0

Snowboarding
World Cup in Yongpyong, South Korea:
Both snowboard cross events are cancelled due to unsafe course conditions.

February 7, 2011 (Monday)

Baseball
Caribbean Series in Mayagüez, Puerto Rico:
 Yaquis de Obregón 3,  Caribes de Anzoátegui 2.
 Toros del Este 3,  Criollos de Caguas 0.
Final standings: Yaquis de Obregón 4–2, Toros del Este, Criollos de Caguas 3–3, Caribes de Anzoátequi 2–4.
Yaquis de Obregón win the series for the first time.

Basketball
The Cleveland Cavaliers set an NBA record for the longest losing streak in history, losing 99–96 to the Dallas Mavericks in Dallas. The Cavs' 25th straight loss breaks the record that the franchise set from 1982 to 1983.

Golf
PGA Tour:
Waste Management Phoenix Open in Scottsdale, Arizona:
Winner: Mark Wilson  266 (−18)PO
Wilson wins his second PGA Tour title of the season, and his fourth career title, defeating Jason Dufner  on the second playoff hole.

February 6, 2011 (Sunday)

Alpine skiing
Men's World Cup in Hinterstoder, Austria:
Giant slalom:  Philipp Schörghofer  2:46.44 (1:21.49 / 1:24.95)  Kjetil Jansrud  2:46.61 (1:21.14 / 1:25.47)  Carlo Janka  2:46.64 (1:21.69 / 1:24.95)
Giant slalom standings (after 5 of 7 races): (1) Ted Ligety  323 points (2) Aksel Lund Svindal  297 (3) Cyprien Richard  253
Overall standings (after 27 of 38 races): (1) Ivica Kostelić  1249 points (2) Didier Cuche  725 (3) Svindal 713
Women's World Cup in Arber-Zwiesel, Germany:
Giant slalom:  Viktoria Rebensburg  1:36.96 (45.82 / 51.14)  Federica Brignone  1:37.49 (47.44 / 50.05)  Kathrin Zettel  1:37.85 (47.00 / 50.85)
Giant slalom standings (after 5 of 8 races): (1) Tessa Worley  358 points (2) Rebensburg 335 (3) Tanja Poutiainen  216
Overall standings (after 23 of 38 races): (1) Maria Riesch  1256 points (2) Lindsey Vonn  1100 (3) Elisabeth Görgl  678

American football
Super Bowl XLV in Arlington, Texas:
Green Bay Packers 31, Pittsburgh Steelers 25
The Packers win their first Super Bowl since 1997, and their fourth overall.

Auto racing
Polish Formula One driver for the Renault F1 team, Robert Kubica sustains serious injuries in a potentially career ending accident while competing privately in a minor motor rally in Italy.
Bathurst 12 Hour in Bathurst, Australia:
(1) Marc Basseng , Christopher Mies  & Darryl O'Young  (Joest Racing Audi R8 LMS) 292 laps, (2) Mark Eddy , Craig Lowndes  & Warren Luff  (Joest Racing Audi R8 LMS) 292 laps, (3) Craig Baird , Klark Quinn  & Tony Quinn  (VIP Pet Foods Racing Porsche 997 GT3 Cup R) 291 laps
Joest Racing's official Audi team wins the 12 Hour on their first attempt with a new record race distance. The race win was also the first competition victory for the Audi R8 GT3.

Baseball
Caribbean Series in Mayagüez, Puerto Rico:
 Caribes de Anzoátegui 3,  Toros del Este 0.
 Criollos de Caguas 7,  Yaquis de Obregón 6.
Standings (after 5 games): Yaquis de Obregón, Criollos de Caguas 3–2, Caribes de Anzoátequi, Toros del Este 2–3.

Biathlon
World Cup 7 in Presque Isle, United States:
Men's 12.5 km Pursuit:  Alexis Bœuf  36:02.4 (0+1+0+1)  Ivan Tcherezov  36:12.7 (1+1+2+0)  Carl Johan Bergman  36:16.7 (1+0+0+2)
Pursuit standings (after 4 of 7 races): (1) Tarjei Bø  184 points (2) Martin Fourcade  158 (3) Ivan Tcherezov  142
Overall standings (after 16 of 26 races): (1) Bø 679 points (2) Emil Hegle Svendsen  592 (3) Fourcade 567
Women's 10 km Pursuit:  Tora Berger  35:12.1 (0+1+2+1)  Marie Dorin  35:42.8 (0+0+1+2)  Darya Domracheva  36:23.3 (0+0+3+2)
Pursuit standings (after 4 of 7 races): (1) Kaisa Mäkäräinen  200 points (2) Helena Ekholm  177 (3) Domracheva 158
Overall standings (after 16 of 26 races): (1) Ekholm 637 points (2) Mäkäräinen 630 (3) Andrea Henkel  579

Bobsleigh
World Cup in Cesana, Italy:
Four-man:  Alexandr Zubkov/Philipp Egorov/Dmitry Trunenkov/Nikolay Hrenkov  1:49.15 (54.42 / 54.73)  Edgars Maskalāns/Daumants Dreiškens/Ugis Zalims/Intars Dambis  1:49.22 (54.42 / 54.80)  Lyndon Rush/Justin Wilkinson/Cody Sorensen/Neville Wright  1:49.35 (54.57 / 54.78)
Final standings: (1) Manuel Machata  1597 points (2) Steve Holcomb  1522 (3) Zubkov 1420
Machata wins his first World Cup title.

Cricket
England in Australia:
7th ODI in Perth:  279/7 (50 overs);  222 (44 overs). Australia win by 57 runs; win 7-match series 6–1.
West Indies in Sri Lanka:
3rd ODI in Colombo:  277/9 (50 overs);  251 (49 overs). Sri Lanka win by 26 runs; win 3-match series 2–0.

Cross-country skiing
World Cup in Rybinsk, Russia:
Men's 4 x 10 km relay:   I (Evgeniy Belov, Maxim Vylegzhanin, Petr Sedov, Alexander Legkov) 1:37:37.6   I (Valerio Checchi, Giorgio Di Centa, Roland Clara, Pietro Piller Cottrer) 1:37:44.0   (Andy Kuehne, Franz Göring, Tom Reichelt, Tobias Angerer) 1:38:10.1
Women's 4 x 5 km relay:   (Magda Genuin, Marianna Longa, Silvia Rupil, Arianna Follis) 53:15.3   I (Valentina Novikova, Svetlana Nikolaeva, Yuliya Chekaleva, Olga Mikhailova) 53:27.4   II (Anastasia Kasakul, Julia Tikhonova, Julia Ivanova, Natalya Korostelyova) 54:39.4

Darts
Players Championship Finals (1) in Doncaster, England:
Final: Phil Taylor  13–2 Gary Anderson

Football (soccer)
South American Youth Championship in Peru: (teams in italics qualify for U-20 World Cup)
Final stage, matchday 3:
 1–0 
 0–0 
 2–1 
Standings (after 3 matches): Uruguay 7 points, Brazil, Argentina 6, Ecuador 5, Colombia 1, Chile 0.
Colombia qualify for U-20 World Cup as host.

Golf
European Tour:
Qatar Masters in Doha, Qatar:
Winner: Thomas Bjørn  274 (−14)
Bjørn wins his eleventh European Tour title.

Ski jumping
World Cup in Oberstdorf, Germany:
HS 213 Team (Ski flying):   (Thomas Morgenstern, Andreas Kofler, Gregor Schlierenzauer, Martin Koch) 1579.1 points   (Johan Remen Evensen, Anders Jacobsen, Bjørn Einar Romøren, Tom Hilde) 1528.6   (Michael Neumayer, Richard Freitag, Michael Uhrmann, Severin Freund) 1479.2

Snooker
German Masters in Berlin, Germany:
Final: Mark Selby  7–9 Mark Williams 
Williams wins his 18th ranking title.

Tennis
ATP World Tour:
SA Tennis Open in Johannesburg, South Africa:
Final: Kevin Anderson  def. Somdev Devvarman  4–6, 6–3, 6–2
Anderson wins his first ATP Tour title.
PBZ Zagreb Indoors in Zagreb, Croatia:
Final: Ivan Dodig  def. Michael Berrer  6–3, 6–4
Dodig wins his first ATP Tour title.
Movistar Open in Santiago, Chile:
Final: Tommy Robredo  def. Santiago Giraldo  6–2, 2–6, 7–6(5)
Robredo wins his tenth ATP Tour title.
Fed Cup World Group First Round, day 2:
 1–4 
Francesca Schiavone  def. Samantha Stosur  7–6(1), 3–6, 7–5
Flavia Pennetta  def. Jarmila Groth  6–3, 6–2
Sara Errani/Roberta Vinci  def. Anastasia Rodionova/Rennae Stubbs  2–6, 7–6(1), 6–4
 3–2 
Anastasia Pavlyuchenkova  def. Alizé Cornet  3–6, 6–3, 6–2
Svetlana Kuznetsova  def. Virginie Razzano  6–4, 6–4
Pavlyuchenkova/Kuznetsova  def. Julie Coin/Cornet  7–6(4), 6–0
 2–3 
Petra Kvitová  def. Daniela Hantuchová  6–4, 6–2
Jana Čepelová  def. Lucie Šafářová  4–6, 7–6(5) retired
Čepelová/Magdaléna Rybáriková  def. Květa Peschke/Barbora Záhlavová-Strýcová  6–1, 4–6, 7–6(4)
 4–1 
Kim Clijsters  def. Bethanie Mattek-Sands  6–7(10), 6–2, 6–1
Yanina Wickmayer  def. Melanie Oudin  6–2, 6–0
Liezel Huber/Vania King  def. Kirsten Flipkens/An-Sophie Mestach  6–3, 7–5

February 5, 2011 (Saturday)

Alpine skiing
Men's World Cup in Hinterstoder, Austria:
Super-G:  Hannes Reichelt  1:43.91  Benjamin Raich  1:44.25  Bode Miller  1:44.84
Super G standings (after 5 of 7 races): (1) Georg Streitberger  227 points (2) Didier Cuche  & Ivica Kostelić  191
Overall standings (after 26 of 38 races): (1) Kostelić 1223 points (2) Silvan Zurbriggen  703 (3) Cuche 685
Women's World Cup in Arber-Zwiesel, Germany:
Giant slalom: Cancelled due to strong winds and bad visibility.

American football
NCAA bowl games:
NFLPA All-Star Game (Texas vs The Nation) in San Antonio, Texas: Texas 13, The Nation 7
In the season's final college football game, Texas linebacker Eddie Jones holds up Damien Berry on fourth down with under a minute remaining, to secure victory.

Baseball
Caribbean Series in Mayagüez, Puerto Rico:
 Yaquis de Obregón 6,  Toros del Este 3
 Criollos de Caguas 4,  Caribes de Anzoátegui 2
Standings (after 4 games): Yaquis de Obregón 3–1, Toros del Este, Criollos de Caguas 2–2, Caribes de Anzoátequi 1–3.

Biathlon
World Cup 7 in Presque Isle, United States:
Mixed Relay:   (Kathrin Hitzer, Magdalena Neuner, Alexander Wolf, Daniel Böhm) 1:13:31.6 (0+11)   (Marie-Laure Brunet, Sophie Boilley, Vincent Jay, Alexis Bœuf) 1:13:59.5 (0+7)   (Svetlana Sleptsova, Natalia Guseva, Ivan Tcherezov, Maxim Tchoudov) 1:14:33.0 (0+13)
Standings (after 2 of 3 races): (1) France 102 points (2)  98 (3) Germany 94

Bobsleigh
World Cup in Cesana, Italy:
Two-man:  Simone Bertazzo/Matteo Torchio  1:50.96 (55.43 / 55.53)  Beat Hefti/Thomas Lamparter  1:51.10 (55.65 / 55.45)  Thomas Florschütz/Kevin Kuske  1:51.11 (55.58 / 55.53)
Final standings: (1) Alexandr Zubkov  1614 points (2) Manuel Machata  1516 (3) Bertazzo 1476
Zubkov becomes the first Russian to win the two-man title, to add to his three four-man titles.
Two-woman:  Helen Upperton/Shelley-Ann Brown  1:54.21 (56.99 / 57.22)  Esmé Kamphuis/Judith Vis  1:54.50 (57.17 / 57.33)  Sandra Kiriasis/Stephanie Schneider  1:54.52 (57.19 / 57.33)
Final standings: (1) Kiriasis 1711 points (2) Cathleen Martini  1563 (3) Kaillie Humphries  1400
Kiriasis wins her eighth successive title, and Germany wins for the tenth successive time.

Cricket
Pakistan in New Zealand:
6th ODI in Auckland:  311/7 (50 overs; Jesse Ryder 107);  254 (44.1 overs). New Zealand win by 57 runs; Pakistan win 6-match series 3–2.
News: An International Cricket Council tribunal finds Pakistani cricketers Mohammad Amir, Mohammad Asif and Salman Butt guilty of corruption, relating to allegations of spot-fixing during the fourth Test of their tour of England in August 2010. Butt was banned for ten years with five years suspended, Asif was handed a seven-year ban with two years suspended, and Amir was given a five-year ban.

Cross-country skiing
World Cup in Rybinsk, Russia:
Men's Sprint Freestyle:  Alexei Petukhov  2:32.7  Ola Vigen Hattestad  2:34.1  Anders Gløersen  2:34.2
Sprint standings (after 8 of 11 races): (1) Hattestad 344 points (2) Emil Jönsson  330 (3) Petukhov 277
Overall standings (after 23 of 31 races): (1) Dario Cologna  1197 points (2) Petter Northug  774 (3) Lukáš Bauer  698
Women's Sprint Freestyle:  Vesna Fabjan  2:54.3  Katja Višnar  2:55.0  Justyna Kowalczyk  2:55.0
Sprint standings (after 8 of 11 races): (1) Petra Majdič  354 points (2) Arianna Follis  333 (3) Kikkan Randall  291
Overall standings (after 23 of 31 races): (1) Kowalczyk 1576 points (2) Follis 975 (3) Marit Bjørgen  922

Equestrianism
Show jumping:
FEI World Cup Western European League:
10th competition in Bordeaux (CSI 5*-W):  Philipp Weishaupt  on Catoki  Simon Delestre  on Napoli du Ry  Rolf-Göran Bengtsson  on Ninja
Standings (after 10 of 13 competitions): (1) Kevin Staut  87 points (2) Bengtsson 73 (3) Billy Twomey  63
Four-in-hand driving:
FEI World Cup:
7th competition in Bordeaux (CAI-W):  IJsbrand Chardon   Tomas Eriksson   Werner Ulrich 
Final standings: (1) Boyd Exell  27 points (2) Koos de Ronde  25 (3) Jozsef Dobrovitz  24

Football (soccer)
OFC Champions League Group stage, matchday 4:
Group A:
Lautoka  1–6  Koloale
Amicale  3–3  PRK Hekari United
Standings (after 4 matches): Amicale, Lautoka 7 points, PRK Hekari United 5, Koloale 3.

Freestyle skiing
World Championships in Deer Valley and Park City, United States:
Men's halfpipe:  Micheal Riddle  45.6 points  Kevin Rolland  45.2  Simon Dumont  43.2
Riddle wins his first world title.
Women's halfpipe:  Rosalind Groenewoud  44.7 points  Jen Hudak  42.1  Keltie Hansen  38.8
Groenewoud wins her first world title.
Men's Dual Moguls:  Alexandre Bilodeau   Mikaël Kingsbury   Nobuyuki Nishi 
Bilodeau wins his second consecutive world title.
Women's Dual Moguls:  Jennifer Heil   Chloé Dufour-Lapointe   Hannah Kearney 
Heil completes the moguls double to win her third consecutive dual moguls title, and fourth title overall.

Mixed martial arts
UFC 126 in Las Vegas, United States:
Middleweight Championship bout: Anderson Silva  (c) def. Vitor Belfort  via TKO (strikes)
Light Heavyweight bout: Forrest Griffin  def. Rich Franklin  by unanimous decision (29–28, 29–28, 29–28)
Welterweight bout: Jake Ellenberger  def. Carlos Eduardo Rocha  by split decision (27–30, 29–28, 29–28)
Light Heavyweight bout: Jon Jones  def. Ryan Bader  by submission (guillotine choke)
Bantamweight bout: Miguel Torres  def. Antonio Banuelos  by unanimous decision (30–27, 30–27, 30–27)

Rugby union
Six Nations Championship, week 1:
 11–13  in Rome
 34–21  in Saint-Denis
European Nations Cup First Division, week 1:
 24–28  in Madrid
 24–17  in Lisbon
 62–3  in Tbilisi
IRB Sevens World Series:
New Zealand Sevens in Wellington:
Shield:  19–12 
Bowl:  19–0 
Plate:  26–12 
Cup:  14–29 
Standings (after 3 of 8 competitions): (1) England & New Zealand 64 points (3)  52

Ski jumping
World Cup in Oberstdorf, Germany:
HS 213 (Ski flying):  Martin Koch  428.4 points  Tom Hilde  406.6  Gregor Schlierenzauer  404.5
Ski flying standings (after 3 of 7 events): (1) Koch 229 points (2) Thomas Morgenstern  195 (3) Hilde 152
Overall standings (after 21 of 26 events): (1) Morgenstern 1529 points (2) Simon Ammann  1099 (3) Andreas Kofler  1016

Snooker
German Masters in Berlin, Germany:
Quarter-finals:
Graeme Dott  5–3 Stephen Maguire 
Mark Selby  5–1 Ding Junhui 
Mark Williams  5–1 Joe Perry 
Joe Swail  1–5 Marco Fu 
Semi-finals:
Dott 4–6 Selby
Williams 6–3 Fu

Tennis
Fed Cup World Group First Round, day 1:
 1–1 
Jarmila Groth  def. Francesca Schiavone  6–7(4), 6–3, 6–3
Flavia Pennetta  def. Samantha Stosur  7–6(5), 6–7(5), 6–4
 0–2 
Alizé Cornet  def. Svetlana Kuznetsova  3–6, 6–3, 6–4
Virginie Razzano  def. Maria Sharapova  6–3, 6–4
 0–2 
Lucie Šafářová  def. Daniela Hantuchová  7–5, 6–1
Petra Kvitová  def. Dominika Cibulková  6–2, 6–3
 2–0 
Yanina Wickmayer  def. Bethanie Mattek-Sands  6–1, 7–6(6)
Kim Clijsters  def. Melanie Oudin  6–0, 6–4

February 4, 2011 (Friday)

Alpine skiing
Women's World Cup in Arber-Zwiesel, Germany:
Slalom:  Marlies Schild  1:55.19 (57.16 / 58.03)  Veronika Zuzulová  1:55.87 (56.72 / 59.15)  Tanja Poutiainen  1:56.97 (57.43 / 59.54)
Slalom standings (after 7 of 10 races): (1) Schild 500 points (2) Poutiainen 460 (3) Maria Riesch  420
Overall standings (after 22 of 38 races): (1) Riesch 1232 points (2) Lindsey Vonn  1087 (3) Poutiainen 640

Baseball
Caribbean Series in Mayagüez, Puerto Rico:
 Yaquis de Obregón 7,  Caribes de Anzoátegui 3
 Toros del Este 4,  Criollos de Caguas 3
Standings (after 3 games): Toros del Este, Yaquis de Obregón 2–1, Criollos de Caguas, Caribes de Anzoátequi 1–2.

Basketball
PBA Philippine Cup Finals (best-of-7 series):
Game 6 in Quezon City: Talk 'N Text Tropang Texters 95, San Miguel Beermen 82. Talk 'N Text win series 4–2.
Talk 'N Text win the championship for the third time.

Biathlon
World Cup 7 in Presque Isle, United States:
Men's 10 km Sprint:  Arnd Peiffer  25:28.8 (0+0)  Martin Fourcade  25:44.7 (0+1)  Ivan Tcherezov  26:05.2 (0+0)
Sprint standings (after 7 of 10 races): (1) Tarjei Bø  297 points (2) Peiffer 239 (3) Emil Hegle Svendsen  231
Overall standings (after 15 of 26 races): (1) Bø 641 points (2) Svendsen 592 (3) Fourcade 531
Women's 7.5 km Sprint:  Helena Ekholm  20:38.7 (0+0)  Tora Berger  20:47.5 (0+1)  Valj Semerenko  20:58.1 (0+0)
Sprint standings (after 7 of 10 races): (1) Kaisa Mäkäräinen  281 points (2) Ekholm 262 (3) Anastasiya Kuzmina  237
Overall standings (after 15 of 26 races): (1) Ekholm 606 points (2) Mäkäräinen 592 (3) Andrea Henkel  539

Cross-country skiing
World Cup in Rybinsk, Russia:
Men's 20 km Pursuit:  Ilia Chernousov  48:54.2  Jean-Marc Gaillard  48:54.6  Maurice Manificat  48:57.2
Distance standings (after 13 of 17 races): (1) Dario Cologna  481 points (2) Alexander Legkov  447 (3) Lukáš Bauer  400
Overall standings (after 22 of 31 races): (1) Cologna 1197 points (2) Petter Northug  774 (3) Bauer 698
Women's 10 km Pursuit:  Justyna Kowalczyk  27:04.2  Marianna Longa  27:14.0  Aino-Kaisa Saarinen  27:24.8
Distance standings (after 13 of 17 races): (1) Kowalczyk 787 points (2) Marit Bjørgen  510 (3) Longa 441
Overall standings (after 22 of 31 races): (1) Kowalczyk 1516 points (2) Arianna Follis  930 (3) Bjørgen 922

Football (soccer)
OFC Champions League Group stage, matchday 4:
Group B: AS Tefana  3–1  Waitakere United
Standings:  Auckland City 5 points (3 matches), Waitakere United 5 (4), AS Tefana 4 (4),  AS Magenta 4 (3).

Freestyle skiing
World Championships in Deer Valley and Park City, United States:
Men's Ski Cross:  Christopher Del Bosco   Jouni Pellinen   Andreas Matt 
Del Bosco wins his first world title.
Women's Ski Cross:  Kelsey Serwa   Julia Murray   Anna Holmlund 
Serwa wins her first world title.
Men's Aerials:  Warren Shouldice  253.66 points  Qi Guangpu  250.95  Anton Kushnir  249.63
Shouldice wins his first world title.
Women's Aerials:  Cheng Shuang  188.40 points  Xu Mengtao  188.23  Olha Volkova  178.59
Cheng wins her first world title.

Rugby union
Six Nations Championship, week 1:
 19–26  in Cardiff

Skeleton
World Cup in Cesana, Italy:
Men:  Martins Dukurs  1:53.06 (56.39 / 56.67)  Tomass Dukurs  1:54.27 (56.99 / 57.28)  Sandro Stielicke  1:54.32 (57.10 / 57.22)
Final standings: (1) Martins Dukurs 1719 points (2) Stielicke 1466 (3) Frank Rommel  1410
Martins Dukurs wins the title for the second successive time.
Women:  Anja Huber  1:56.71 (58.35 / 58.36)  Marion Thees  1:56.77 (58.46 / 58.31)  Darla Deschamps  1:57.07 (58.48 / 58.59)
Final standings: (1) Huber 1710 points (2) Shelley Rudman  1642 (3) Mellisa Hollingsworth  1516
Huber wins her first World Cup title.

Snooker
German Masters in Berlin, Germany:
Last 32:
John Higgins  5–3 Robert Milkins 
Mark Williams  5–1 Anthony McGill 
Mark King  1–5 Marco Fu 
Stephen Maguire  5–2 Daniel Wells 
Last 16:
Anthony Hamilton  2–5 Graeme Dott 
Mark Selby  5–3 Stephen Hendry 
Peter Ebdon  2–5 Ding Junhui 
Shaun Murphy  2–5 Joe Swail 
Ricky Walden  0–5 Maguire
Williams 5–2 Dominic Dale 
Joe Perry  5–1 Ali Carter 
Higgins w/d–w/o Fu
Higgins withdraws after his father's death.

February 3, 2011 (Thursday)

Baseball
Caribbean Series in Mayagüez, Puerto Rico:
 Toros del Este 6,  Caribes de Anzoátegui 5
 Criollos de Caguas 7,  Yaquis de Obregón 3
Standings (after 2 games): Toros del Este, Criollos de Caguas, Yaquis de Obregón, Caribes de Anzoátequi 1–1.

Basketball
Euroleague Top 16, matchday 3:
Group E:
Caja Laboral  77–70  Panathinaikos Athens
Unicaja Málaga  98–91  Lietuvos Rytas
Standings (after 3 games): Caja Laboral, Panathinaikos Athens 2–1; Unicaja Málaga, Lietuvos Rytas 1–2.
Group F:
Maccabi Tel Aviv  104–67  Union Olimpija Ljubljana
Regal FC Barcelona  80–56  Virtus Roma
Standings (after 3 games): Regal FC Barcelona 3–0; Maccabi Tel Aviv 2–1; Union Olimpija Ljubljana 1–2; Virtus Roma 0–3.
Group G:
Real Madrid  89–86 (OT)  Efes Pilsen Istanbul
Partizan Belgrade  58–66  Montepaschi Siena
Standings (after 3 games): Real Madrid 3–0; Efes Pilsen 2–1; Montepaschi Siena 1–2; Partizan Belgrade 0–3.

Cricket
Pakistan in New Zealand:
5th ODI in Hamilton:  268/9 (50 overs; Ahmed Shehzad 115);  227 (46.5 overs). Pakistan win by 41 runs; lead 6-match series 3–1.
West Indies in Sri Lanka:
2nd ODI in Colombo:  203 (50 overs);  199/2 (42.3/47 overs; Upul Tharanga 101*). Sri Lanka win by 8 wickets (D/L); lead 3-match series 1–0.

Football (soccer)
South American Youth Championship in Peru:
Final stage, matchday 2:
 1–1 
 2–3 
 2–0 
Standings (after 2 matches): Brazil 6 points, Ecuador, Uruguay 4, Argentina 3, Colombia, Chile 0.
Copa Libertadores First Stage, second leg (first leg score in parentheses):
Deportivo Petare  1–1 (0–1)  Cerro Porteño. Cerro Porteño win 4–1 on points.
Unión Española  0–0 (1–0)  Bolívar. Unión Española win 4–1 on points.

Freestyle skiing
World Championships in Deer Valley and Park City, United States:
Men's slopestyle:  Alex Schlopy  41.8 points  Sammy Carlson  41.5  Russ Henshaw  41.2
Women's slopestyle:  Anna Segal  43.4 points  Kaya Turski  41.7  Keri Herman  41.0

Snooker
German Masters in Berlin, Germany:
Wild-card round:
Liu Song  2–5 Daniel Wells 
Robert Milkins  5–1 Lasse Münstermann 
Last 32:
Ding Junhui  5–1 Matthew Stevens 
Stephen Hendry  5–2 Judd Trump 
Mark Selby  5–1 Nigel Bond 
Graeme Dott  5–1 Thanawat Thirapongpaiboon 
Mark Allen  3–5 Joe Swail 
Peter Ebdon  5–3 Andrew Higginson 
Neil Robertson  4–5 Anthony Hamilton 
Shaun Murphy  5–3 Ryan Day 
Ricky Walden  5–2 Jack Lisowski 
Ali Carter  5–4 Stephen Lee 
Jamie Cope  3–5 Joe Perry

February 2, 2011 (Wednesday)

Baseball
Caribbean Series in Mayagüez, Puerto Rico:
 Yaquis de Obregón 4,  Toros del Este 3 (15 innings)
 Caribes de Anzoátegui 5,  Criollos de Caguas 3

Basketball
PBA Philippine Cup Finals (best-of-7 series):
Game 5 in Quezon City: Talk 'N Text Tropang Texters 99, San Miguel Beermen 77. Talk 'N Text lead series 3–2.
Euroleague Top 16, matchday 3:
Group H:
Fenerbahçe Ülker  80–72  Žalgiris Kaunas
Olympiacos Piraeus  77–62  Power Electronics Valencia
Standings (after 3 games): Fenerbahçe Ülker 3–0; Olympiacos Piraeus 2–1; Power Electronics Valencia 1–2; Žalgiris Kaunas 0–3.

Cricket
England in Australia:
6th ODI in Sydney:  333/6 (50 overs; Jonathan Trott 137);  334/8 (49.2 overs). Australia win by 2 wickets; lead 7-match series 5–1.
Australia make their highest successful run chase, after England record their highest score against Australia.

Football (soccer)
Copa Libertadores First Stage, second leg (first leg score in parentheses):
Deportes Tolima  2–0 (0–0)  Corinthians. Deportes Tolima win 4–1 on points.
Grêmio  3–1 (2–2)  Liverpool. Grêmio win 4–1 on points.

Freestyle skiing
World Championships in Deer Valley and Park City, United States:
Men's Moguls:  Guilbaut Colas  26.26 points  Alexandre Bilodeau  25.66  Mikaël Kingsbury  25.57
Colas wins his first world title.
Women's Moguls:  Jennifer Heil  24.35 points  Hannah Kearney  24.31  Kristi Richards  23.71
Heil wins her first moguls world title, and third overall.

Ski jumping
World Cup in Klingenthal, Germany:
HS 140:  Kamil Stoch  264.6 points  Thomas Morgenstern  264.0  Simon Ammann  263.3
Standings (after 20 of 26 events): (1) Morgenstern 1514 points (2) Ammann 1073 (3) Andreas Kofler  980

Snooker
German Masters in Berlin, Germany, wild-card round:
Anthony Hamilton  5–1 Pavel Leyk 
Thanawat Thirapongpaiboon  5–3 Tomasz Skalski 
Jack Lisowski  5–2 Luca Brecel 
Nigel Bond  5–2 Stefan Kasper 
Joe Swail  5–0 Hans Blanckaert

February 1, 2011 (Tuesday)

Cricket
Pakistan in New Zealand:
4th ODI in Napier:  262/7 (50 overs);  264/8 (49 overs). Pakistan win by 2 wickets; lead 6-match series 2–1.

Football (soccer)
Copa Libertadores First Stage, second leg (first leg score in parentheses):
Deportivo Quito  1–0 (0–2)  Independiente. 3–3 on points; Independiente win 2–1 on aggregate.
Jaguares  2–0 (2–0)  Alianza Lima. Jaguares win 6–0 on points.

References

2